= Hycleus pulchripennis =

Scientific classification
- Kingdom: Animalia
- Phylum: Arthropoda
- Class: Insecta
- Order: Coleoptera
- Suborder: Polyphaga
- Infraorder: Cucujiformia
- Family: Meloidae
- Genus: Hycleus
- Species: H. pulchripennis

Binomial name
- Hycleus pulchripennis (Pic, 1910)

Synonyms
- Actenodia pulchripennis; Coryna pulchripennis; Pic, 1910

Species of beetle

Hycleus pulchripennis is a species of blister beetles of the family Meloidae that lives in São Tomé and Príncipe. The species was described in 1910. Formerly described as species of the genus Actenodia, it was attributed to Hycleus in 2008.
