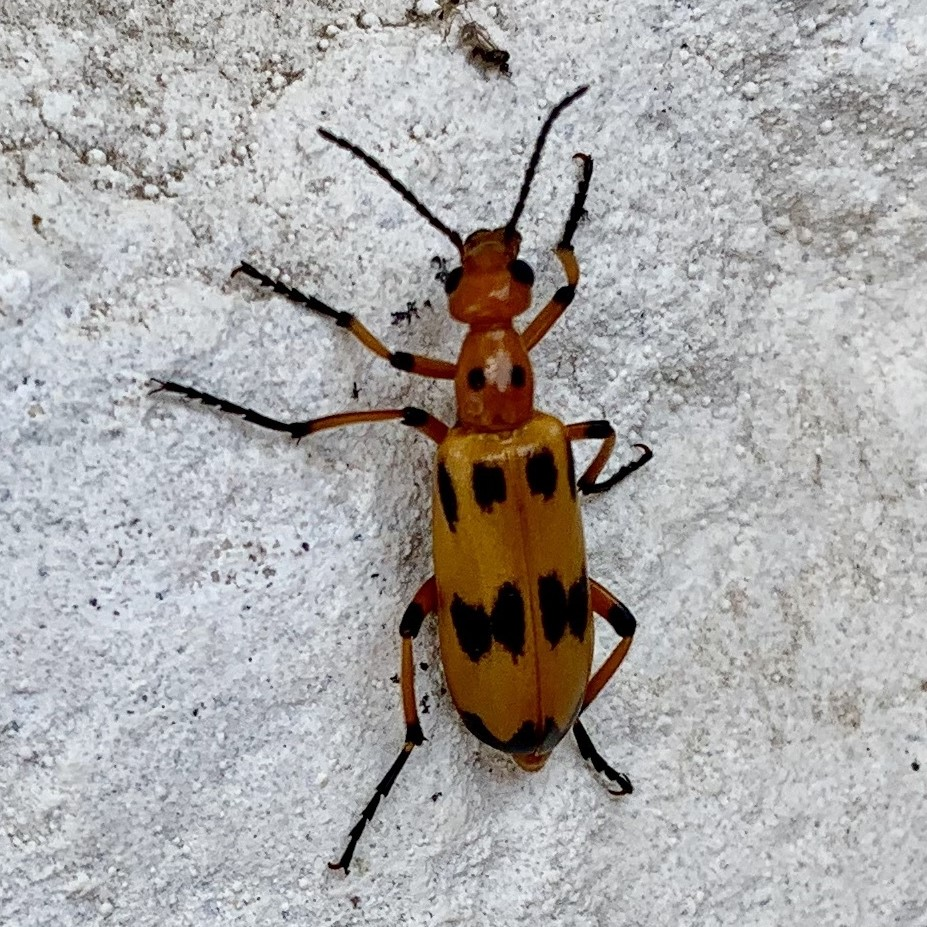

Scientific classification
- Kingdom: Animalia
- Phylum: Arthropoda
- Class: Insecta
- Order: Coleoptera
- Suborder: Polyphaga
- Infraorder: Cucujiformia
- Family: Meloidae
- Genus: Pyrota
- Species: P. fasciata

Binomial name
- Pyrota fasciata Selander, 1963

= Pyrota fasciata =

Species of beetle

Pyrota fasciata is a species of blister beetle in the family Meloidae. It is found in Central America and North America.

It measures between 10 and 21 mm, although most specimens have a length below 15 mm. It is identifiable thanks to its uniform background shell color, which differs from other species such as Pyrota punctata, which has a 2-toned shell background.
