= Zonitoschema krombeini =

Scientific classification
- Kingdom: Animalia
- Phylum: Arthropoda
- Clade: Pancrustacea
- Class: Insecta
- Order: Coleoptera
- Suborder: Polyphaga
- Infraorder: Cucujiformia
- Family: Meloidae
- Genus: Zonitoschema
- Species: Z. krombeini

Binomial name
- Zonitoschema krombeini Mohamedsaid, 1979

Species of beetle

Zonitoschema krombeini is a species of Meloidae endemic to Sri Lanka.

== Description ==
Body length is about 7.8 to 13.7 mm.
