= Tetraonyx fulva =

Scientific classification
- Domain: Eukaryota
- Kingdom: Animalia
- Phylum: Arthropoda
- Class: Insecta
- Order: Coleoptera
- Suborder: Polyphaga
- Infraorder: Cucujiformia
- Family: Meloidae
- Genus: Tetraonyx
- Species: T. fulva

Binomial name
- Tetraonyx fulva LeConte, 1853

Species of blister beetle from North America

Tetraonyx fulva is a species of blister beetle in the family Meloidae. It is found in North America.
