= Sybaris nigrifinis =

Scientific classification
- Kingdom: Animalia
- Phylum: Arthropoda
- Clade: Pancrustacea
- Class: Insecta
- Order: Coleoptera
- Suborder: Polyphaga
- Infraorder: Cucujiformia
- Family: Meloidae
- Genus: Sybaris
- Species: S. nigrifinis

Binomial name
- Sybaris nigrifinis Walker, 1858

Synonyms
- Epicausta [sic] nigrifnis Walker, 1858; Lytta nigrifils Borchmann, 1917; Sybaris nigrifnis Blair, 1921; Cantharis usta Fairmaire, 1896; Lytta usta Borchmann, 1917; Zonitis ceylonica Pic, 1941

Species of beetle

Sybaris nigrifinis is a species of blister beetle found in India and Sri Lanka.

== Description ==
Body length is about 10.7 to 14.1 mm.
