= Pyrota sinuata =

Scientific classification
- Kingdom: Animalia
- Phylum: Arthropoda
- Clade: Pancrustacea
- Class: Insecta
- Order: Coleoptera
- Suborder: Polyphaga
- Infraorder: Cucujiformia
- Family: Meloidae
- Genus: Pyrota
- Species: P. sinuata

Binomial name
- Pyrota sinuata (Olivier, 1795)

Species of beetle

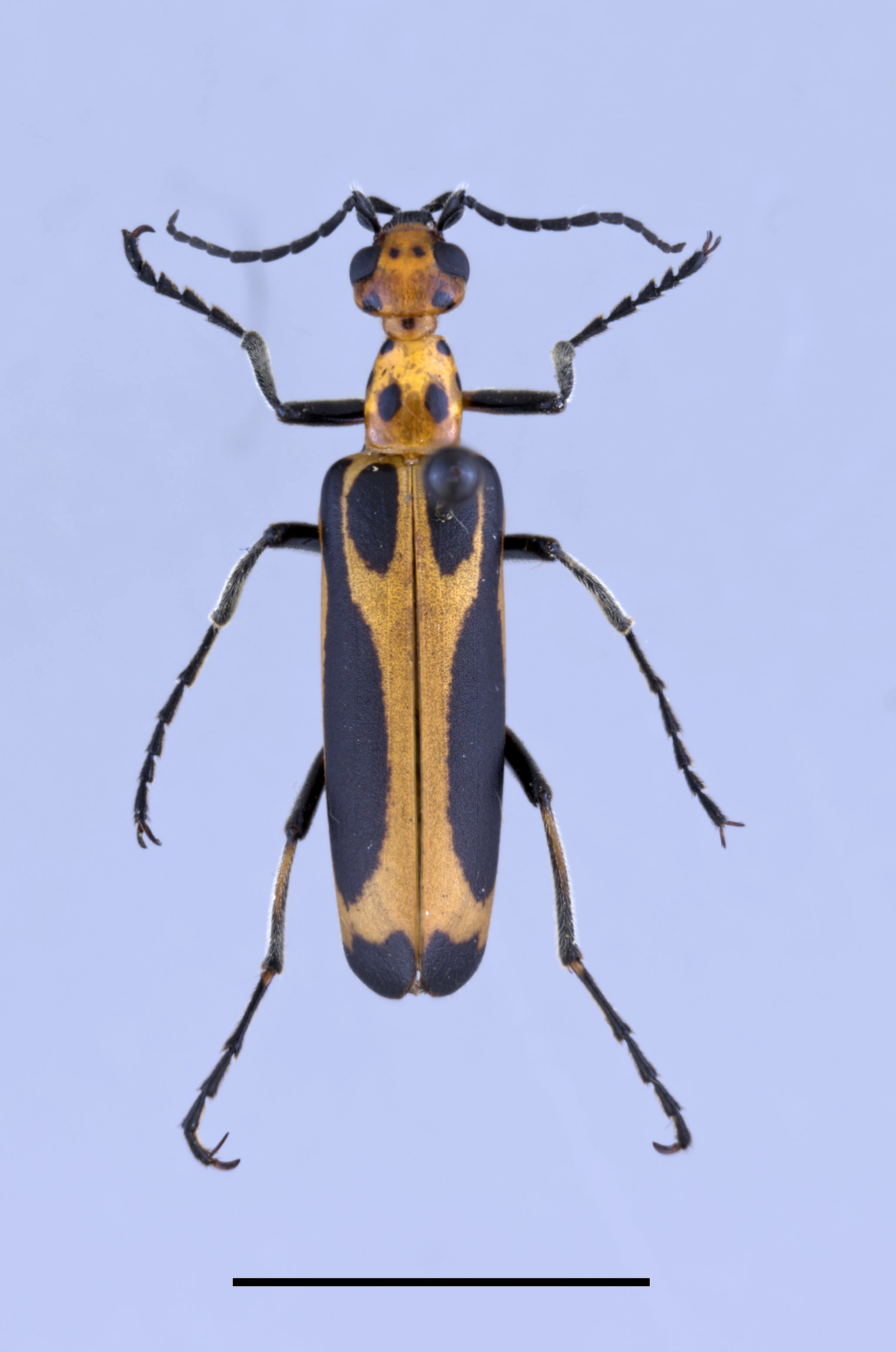
Dorsal view of a Pyrota sinuata (Olivier, 1790) specimen collected from Treutlen County, Georgia on October 3, 2024. Scale bar indicates 10 mm.

Pyrota sinuata is a species of blister beetle in the family Meloidae. It is found in North America.
