= Linsleya sphaericollis =

Scientific classification
- Domain: Eukaryota
- Kingdom: Animalia
- Phylum: Arthropoda
- Class: Insecta
- Order: Coleoptera
- Suborder: Polyphaga
- Infraorder: Cucujiformia
- Family: Meloidae
- Genus: Linsleya
- Species: L. sphaericollis

Binomial name
- Linsleya sphaericollis (Say, 1824)

Species of beetle

Linsleya sphaericollis, the ash blister beetle, is a species of blister beetle in the family Meloidae. It is found in North America.
