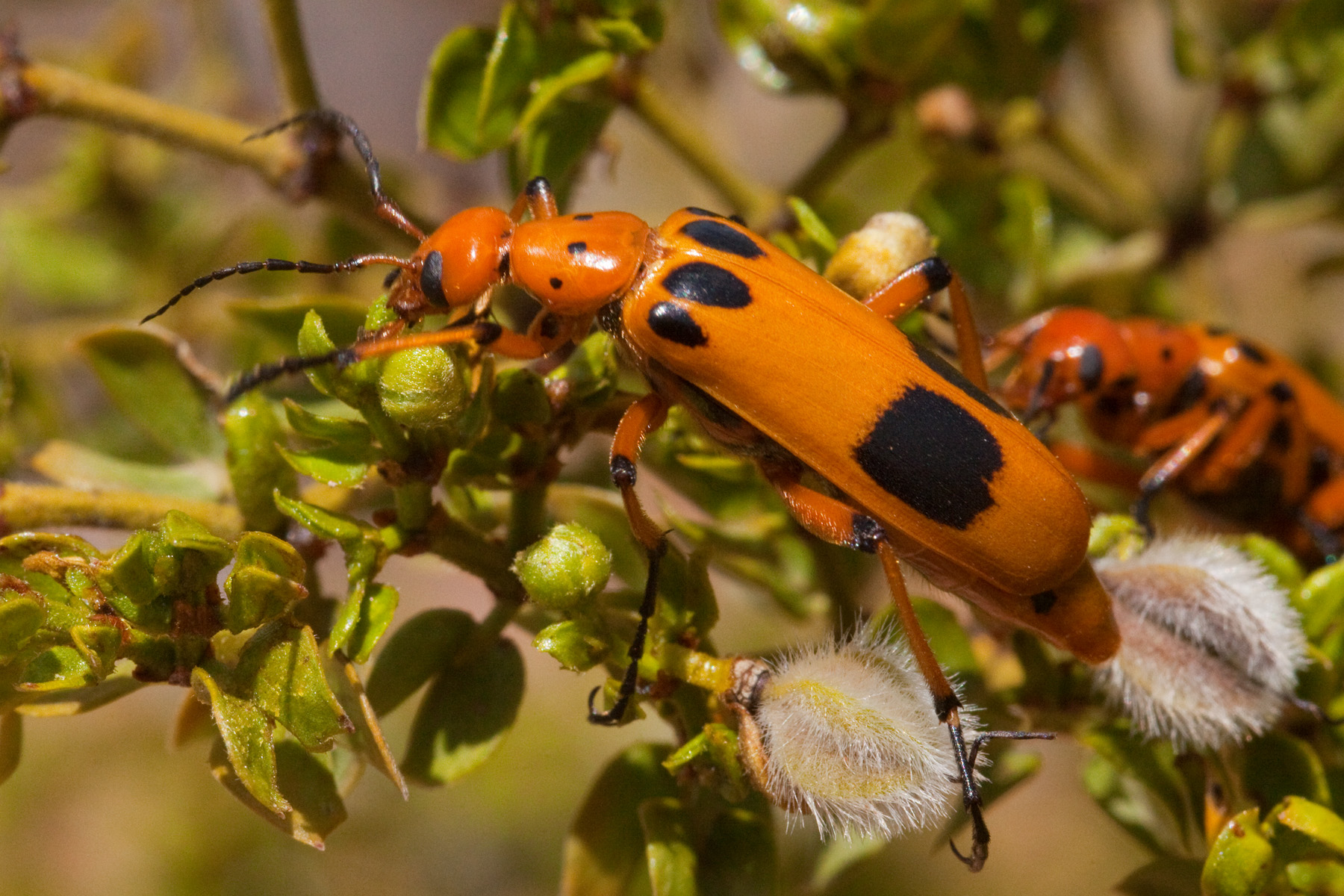

Scientific classification
- Domain: Eukaryota
- Kingdom: Animalia
- Phylum: Arthropoda
- Class: Insecta
- Order: Coleoptera
- Suborder: Polyphaga
- Infraorder: Cucujiformia
- Family: Meloidae
- Genus: Pyrota
- Species: P. postica

Binomial name
- Pyrota postica LeConte, 1858

= Pyrota postica =

Species of beetle

Pyrota postica is a species of blister beetle in the family Meloidae. It is found in Central America and North America.
