= Apalus bimaculatus =

Scientific classification
- Kingdom: Animalia
- Phylum: Arthropoda
- Clade: Pancrustacea
- Class: Insecta
- Order: Coleoptera
- Suborder: Polyphaga
- Infraorder: Cucujiformia
- Family: Meloidae
- Genus: Apalus
- Species: A. bimaculatus

Binomial name
- Apalus bimaculatus Linnaeus, 1761

Synonyms
- Meloe bimaculatus Linnaeus, 1760; Hapalus caruanae Prochazka, 1892; Hapalus lecomptei Pic, 1896; Apalus flava Escherich, 1897

Species of beetle

Apalus bimaculatus, the early blister beetle, is a species of blister beetle from the family Meloidae. It is the type species of the genus Apalus.

== Description ==
This species is a 1 centimetre (0.39 in) long predominantly black beetle which has distinctive yellow-orange elytra each with a single black dot near the posterior end of each elytron. The females have a swollen abdomen and some of its segments are yellowish in colour.

== Distribution ==
Apalus bimaculatus is a widespread species over much of Europe, as far north as southern Scandinavia although it is absent from Great Britain.

== Habitat and biology ==
Apalus bimaculatus occurs in sandy area such as coastal dunes and riparian floodplains as well as being found in man made habitats such as sand pits and sand quarries. It is a cleptoparasite of the solitary bee Colletes cunicularius. The adults of this beetle emerge early in the spring to mate and to lay their eggs near the nesting aggregations of their host bee. They are short-lived and the females die after mating and the eggs hatch from the body of their mother and the larvae crawl out of the protection of their mother's corpse. The first instar of larvae, the triungulins, are thought to be phoretic and to be carried to the host's nest by attaching themselves to the adult bees when they emerge from their natal nests in the spring, although this has not been conclusively demonstrated in A. bimaculatus. The triungulins do however react to the secretions of the adult host bees, orienting their movements towards them and this may be the first stage of being carried to the nest. Once in the nest they consume the pollen stores of the bee as well as any unhatched eggs or larvae and overwinter to emerge in the early Spring.

== Conservation status ==
Globally Apalus bimaculatus is not regarded as threatened or endangered and in Scandinavia this species is regarded as Least Concern in Sweden, although in the past it has been assessed as "at risk" or "near threatened". Local populations are considered to be vulnerable to human development and programmes of translocation have been used to conserve populations of both the beetles and the nesting aggregations of Colletes cunicularius they use to host their larvae. In Norway it was similarly regarded as being rare but has since been shown to be quite common in the south with at least 20 populations known, one reason for its apparent scarcity is that it in the Spring it emerges very early, earlier that most entomologists.
