= Pyrota engelmanni =

Scientific classification
- Kingdom: Animalia
- Phylum: Arthropoda
- Class: Insecta
- Order: Coleoptera
- Suborder: Polyphaga
- Infraorder: Cucujiformia
- Family: Meloidae
- Genus: Pyrota
- Species: P. engelmanni

Binomial name
- Pyrota engelmanni LeConte, 1847

Species of beetle

Pyrota engelmanni is a species of blister beetle in the family Meloidae. It is found in North America.
