= Pyrota akhurstiana =

Scientific classification
- Domain: Eukaryota
- Kingdom: Animalia
- Phylum: Arthropoda
- Class: Insecta
- Order: Coleoptera
- Suborder: Polyphaga
- Infraorder: Cucujiformia
- Family: Meloidae
- Genus: Pyrota
- Species: P. akhurstiana

Binomial name
- Pyrota akhurstiana Horn, 1891

Species of beetle

Pyrota akhurstiana is a species of blister beetle in the family Meloidae. It is found in North America.
