= Pyrota mutata =

Scientific classification
- Domain: Eukaryota
- Kingdom: Animalia
- Phylum: Arthropoda
- Class: Insecta
- Order: Coleoptera
- Suborder: Polyphaga
- Infraorder: Cucujiformia
- Family: Meloidae
- Genus: Pyrota
- Species: P. mutata

Binomial name
- Pyrota mutata Gemminger, 1870

Synonyms
- Pyrota germari Haldeman, 1845

Species of beetle

Pyrota mutata is a species of blister beetle in the family Meloidae. The beetle was historically known as Pyrota germari, but this is no longer the accepted name for the species.
