= Sybaris testaceus =

Scientific classification
- Kingdom: Animalia
- Phylum: Arthropoda
- Clade: Pancrustacea
- Class: Insecta
- Order: Coleoptera
- Suborder: Polyphaga
- Infraorder: Cucujiformia
- Family: Meloidae
- Genus: Sybaris
- Species: S. testaceus

Binomial name
- Sybaris testaceus (Fabricius, 1792)

Synonyms
- Lytta testacea Fabricius, 1792; Cantharis testacea Fairmaire, 1896; Sybaris testacea Blair, 1921

Species of beetle

Sybaris testaceus is a species of blister beetle found in India and Sri Lanka.

== Description ==
Body length is about 8.7 to 16.6 mm.
