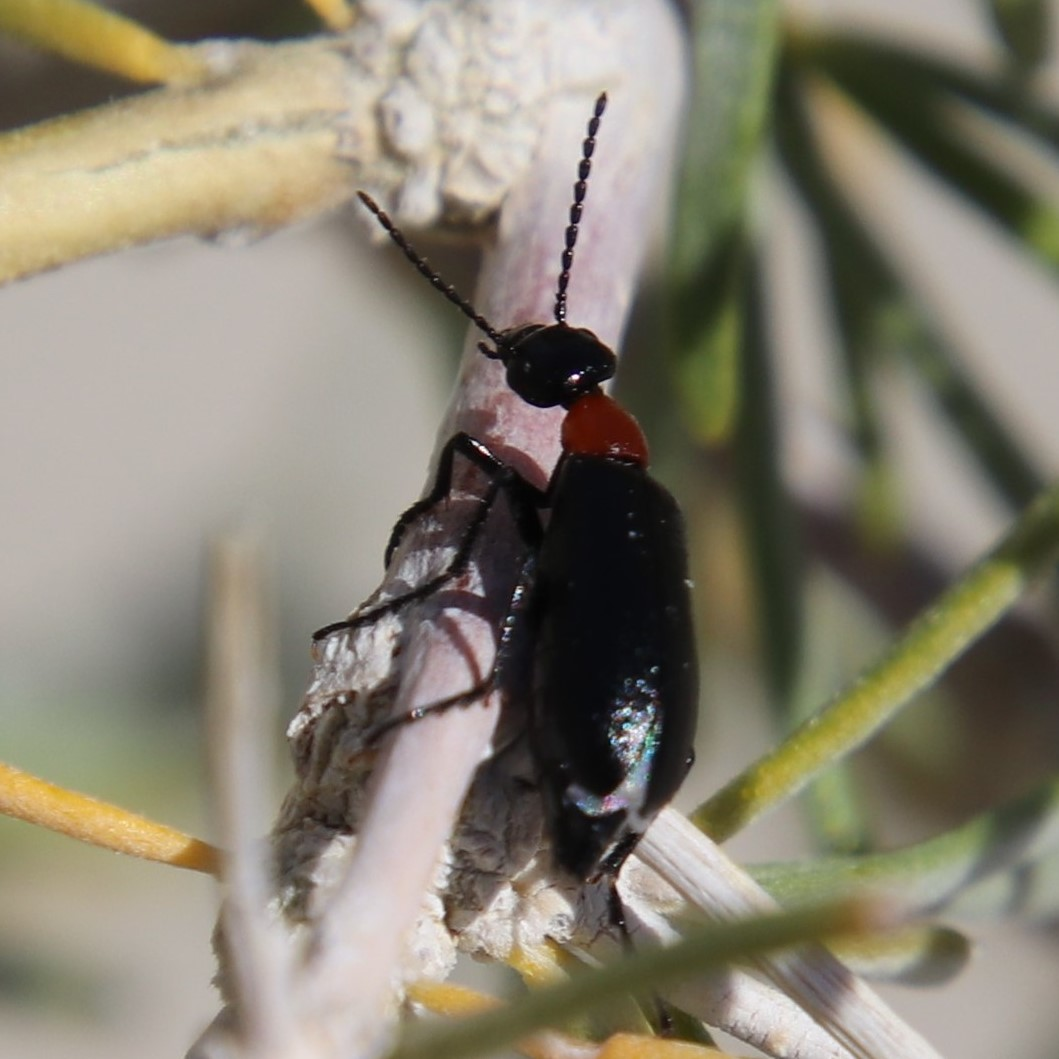

Scientific classification
- Kingdom: Animalia
- Phylum: Arthropoda
- Class: Insecta
- Order: Coleoptera
- Suborder: Polyphaga
- Infraorder: Cucujiformia
- Family: Meloidae
- Genus: Spastonyx
- Species: S. nemognathoides

Binomial name
- Spastonyx nemognathoides (Horn, 1870)

= Spastonyx nemognathoides =

Species of beetle

Spastonyx nemognathoides is a species of blister beetle in the family Meloidae. It is found in North America.
