= Tetraonyx quadrimaculata =

Scientific classification
- Kingdom: Animalia
- Phylum: Arthropoda
- Clade: Pancrustacea
- Class: Insecta
- Order: Coleoptera
- Suborder: Polyphaga
- Infraorder: Cucujiformia
- Family: Meloidae
- Genus: Tetraonyx
- Species: T. quadrimaculata

Binomial name
- Tetraonyx quadrimaculata (Fabricius, 1792)

Species of beetle

Tetraonyx quadrimaculata is a species of blister beetle in the family Meloidae. It is found in the Caribbean Sea and North America.
