= Cantarella (disambiguation) =

Cantarella was a poison allegedly used by the Borgias.

Cantarella may also refer to:

- Cantarella (manga), a manga series by You Higuri
- Eva Cantarella (born 1936), Italian classicist
- Richard Cantarella (born 1944), former American mobster
