= Linsleya suavissima =

Scientific classification
- Domain: Eukaryota
- Kingdom: Animalia
- Phylum: Arthropoda
- Class: Insecta
- Order: Coleoptera
- Suborder: Polyphaga
- Infraorder: Cucujiformia
- Family: Meloidae
- Tribe: Epicautini
- Genus: Linsleya
- Species: L. suavissima

Binomial name
- Linsleya suavissima (Wellman, 1910)

Species of beetle

Linsleya suavissima is a species of blister beetle in the family Meloidae. It is found in Central America and North America.
