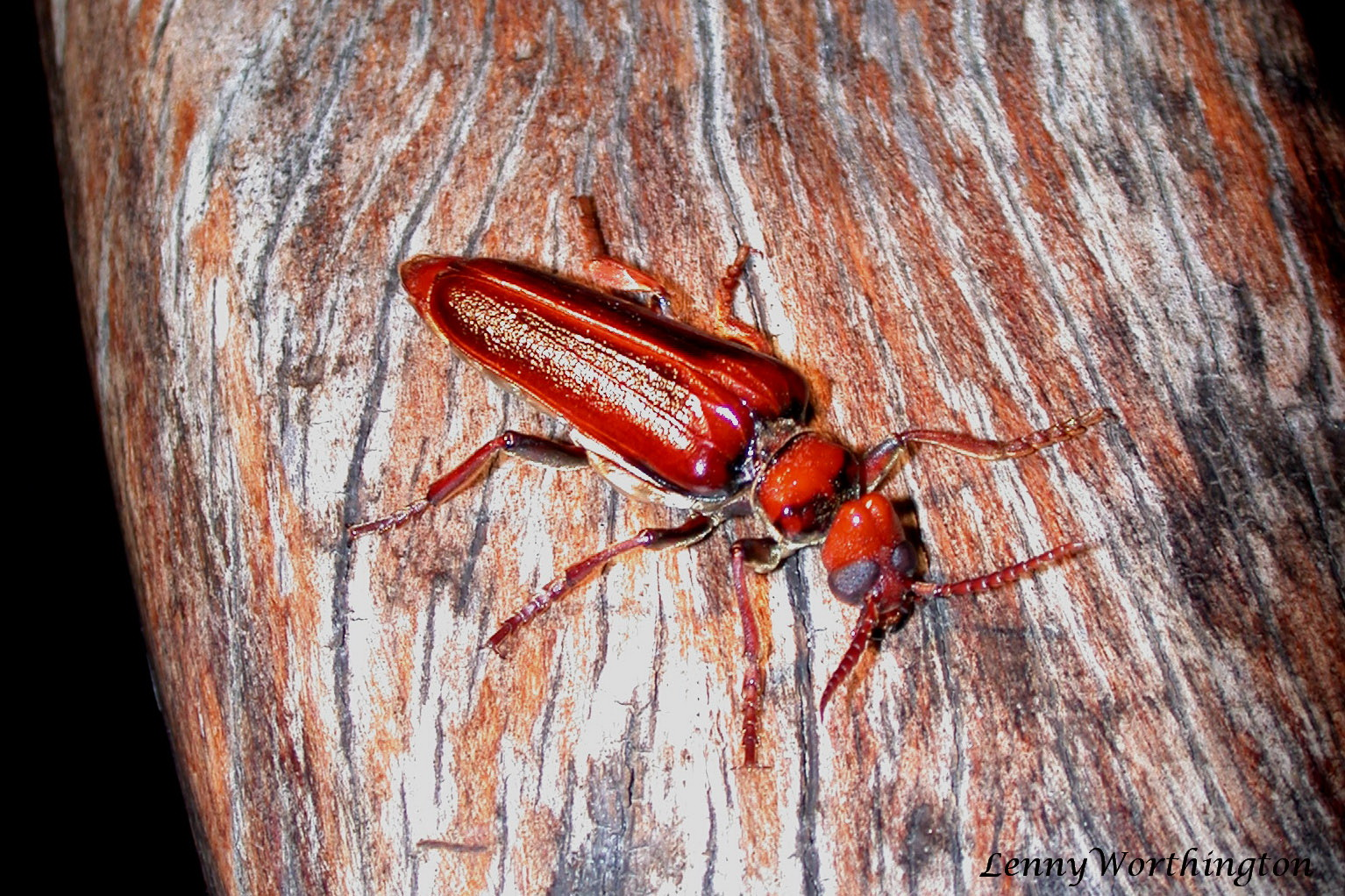

Scientific classification
- Kingdom: Animalia
- Phylum: Arthropoda
- Clade: Pancrustacea
- Class: Insecta
- Order: Coleoptera
- Suborder: Polyphaga
- Infraorder: Cucujiformia
- Family: Meloidae
- Genus: Eletica
- Species: E. testacea

Binomial name
- Eletica testacea (Olivier, 1789)

Synonyms
- Cantharis testacea Olivier, 1789; Lytta testacea Olivier, 1795; Cantharis testacea Haag-Rutenberg, 1879

= Eletica testacea =

Species of beetle

Eletica testacea, is a species of blister beetle found in India, Sri Lanka, Laos and Thailand.

== Description ==
Body length is about 35.2 to 28.5 mm. Head is 6.2 to 6.5 mm.
