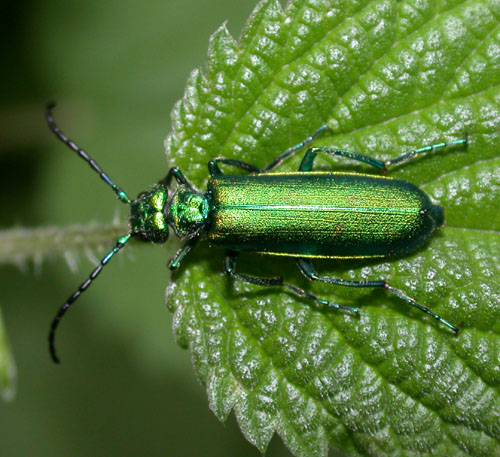
- Spanish fly (Lytta vesicatoria)

Scientific classification
- Kingdom: Animalia
- Phylum: Arthropoda
- Clade: Pancrustacea
- Class: Insecta
- Order: Coleoptera
- Suborder: Polyphaga
- Infraorder: Cucujiformia
- Family: Meloidae
- Subfamily: Meloinae
- Tribe: Lyttini

Genera
- Acrolytta; Afrolytta; Alosimus; Berberomeloe; Cabalia; Cyaneolytta; Dictyolytta; Eolydus; Epispasta; Lagorina; Lydomorphus; Lydulus; Lydus; Lytta; Lyttolydulus; Lyttonyx; Megalytta; Muzimes; Oenas; Parameloe; Paroenas; Physomeloe; Prionotolytta; Prolytta; Pseudosybaris; Sybaris; Teratolytta; Tetraolytta; Trichomeloe

= Lyttini =

Tribe of beetles

Lyttini is a tribe of blister beetles in the subfamily Meloinae.
