= Sybaris yakkala =

Scientific classification
- Kingdom: Animalia
- Phylum: Arthropoda
- Clade: Pancrustacea
- Class: Insecta
- Order: Coleoptera
- Suborder: Polyphaga
- Infraorder: Cucujiformia
- Family: Meloidae
- Genus: Sybaris
- Species: S. yakkala

Binomial name
- Sybaris yakkala Mohamedsaid, 1979

Species of beetle

Sybaris yakkala is a species of blister beetle endemic to Sri Lanka.

== Description ==
Body length is about 10.3 to 13.7 mm.
