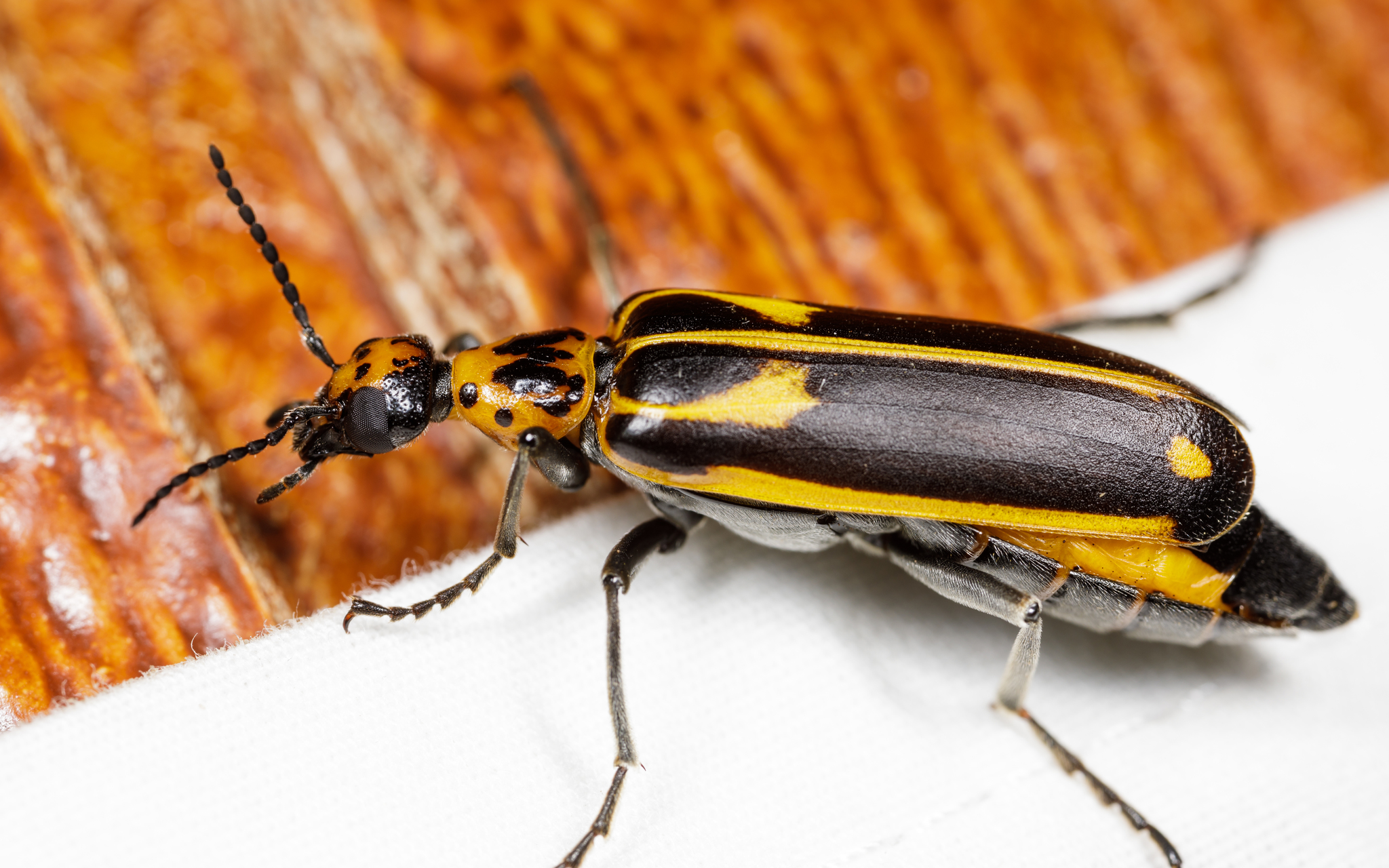
- Yellow-crescent blister beetle (Pyrota insulata) in the United States

Scientific classification
- Kingdom: Animalia
- Phylum: Arthropoda
- Clade: Pancrustacea
- Class: Insecta
- Order: Coleoptera
- Suborder: Polyphaga
- Infraorder: Cucujiformia
- Family: Meloidae
- Genus: Pyrota
- Species: P. insulata

Binomial name
- Pyrota insulata LeConte, 1858

= Pyrota insulata =

Species of beetle

Pyrota insulata, sometimes known as the yellow-crescent blister beetle, is a species of blister beetle in the family Meloidae. Like other blister beetles, it produces the irritant cantharidin, which can cause blistering on human skin.

== Distribution ==
Pyrota insulata is found in the United States (primarily Texas) and Mexico.

== Description ==
Pyrota insulata reaches a length of about 2 cm (0.79 in).

== Gallery ==
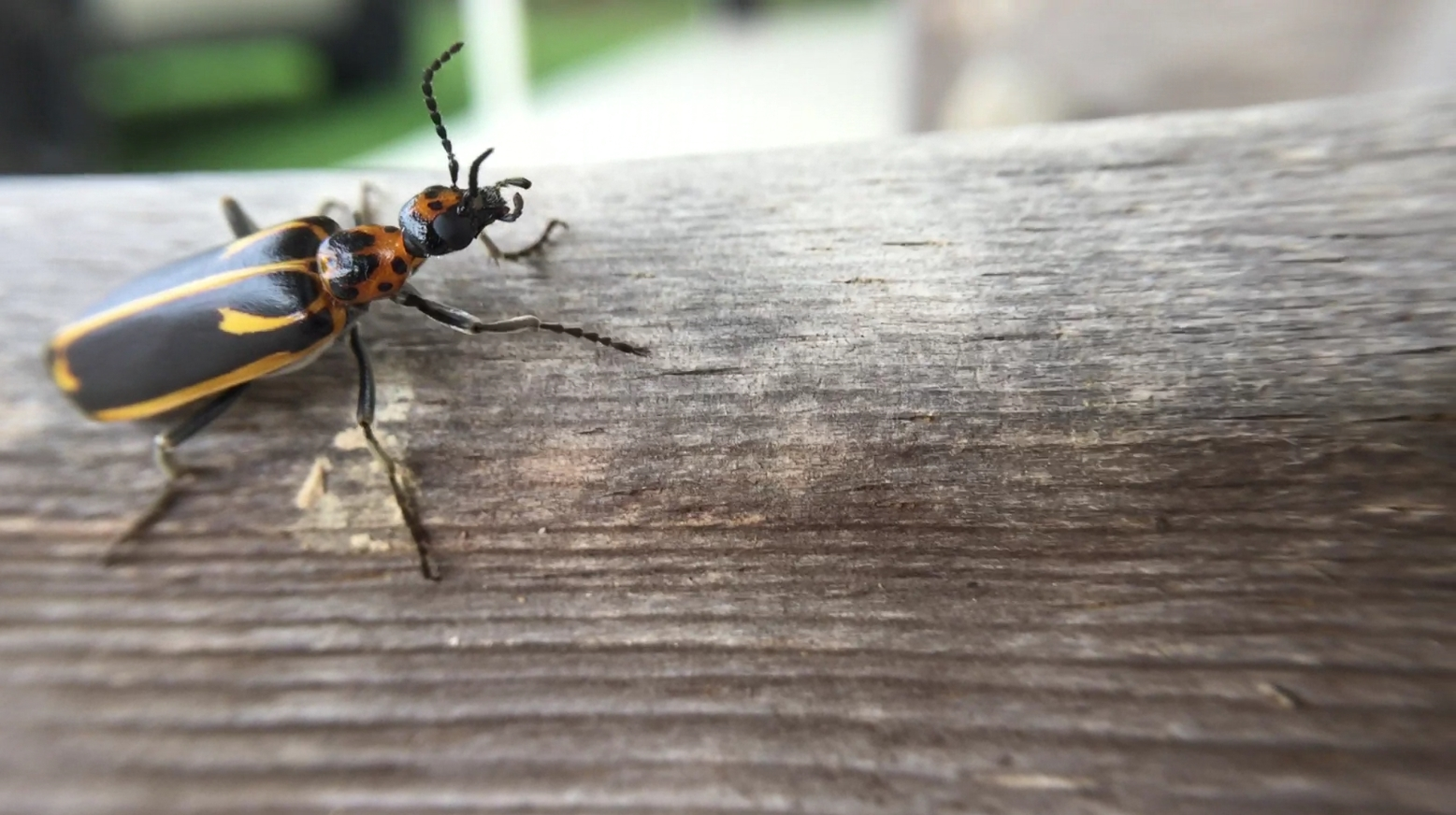
Individual in Texas, United States

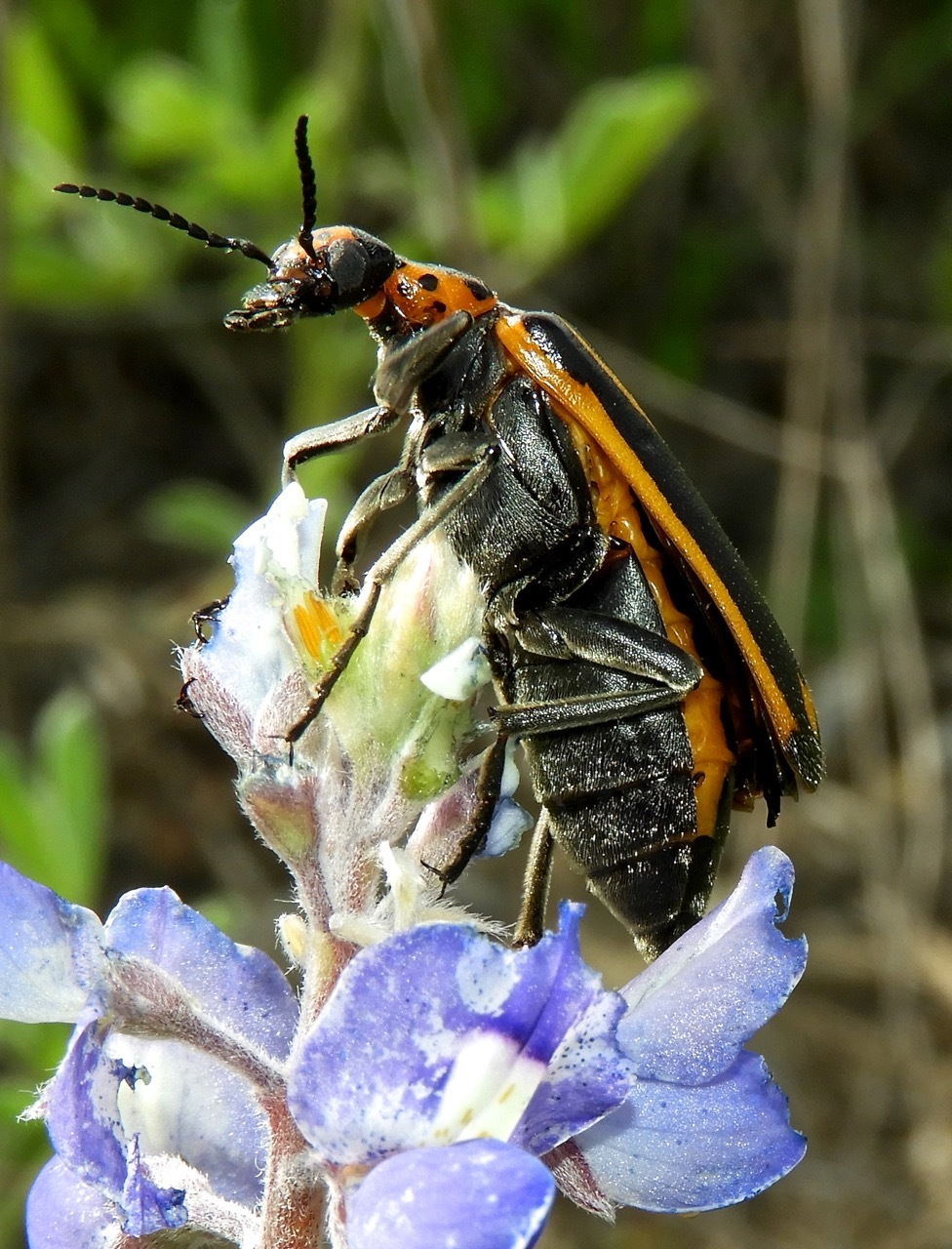

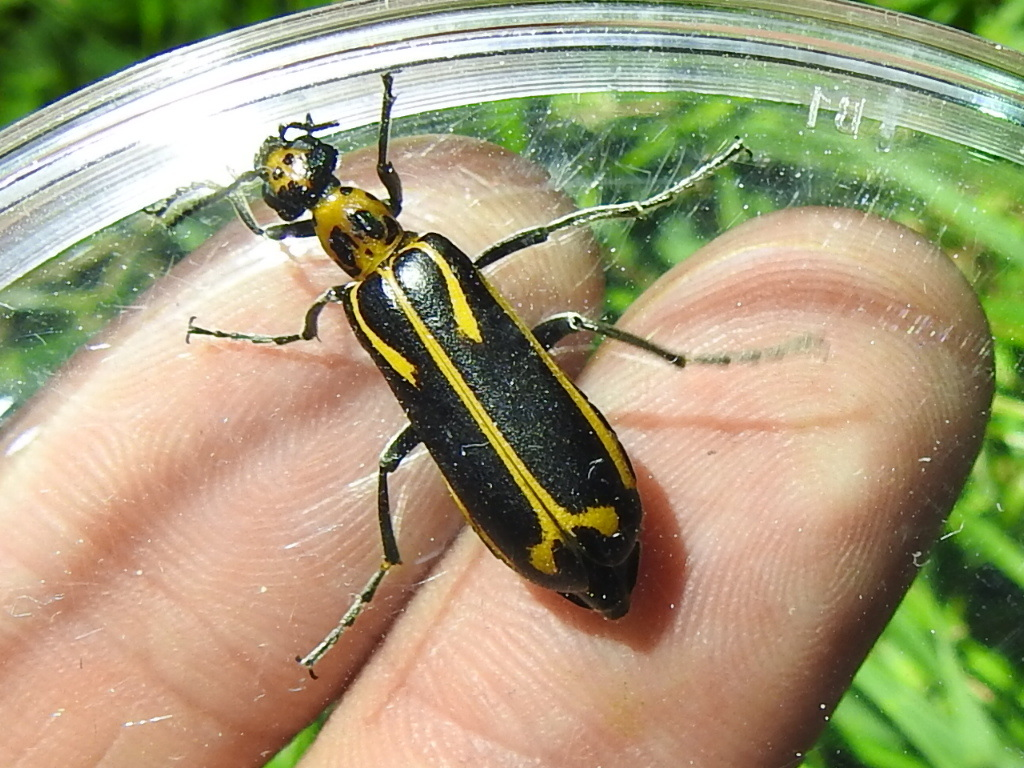
