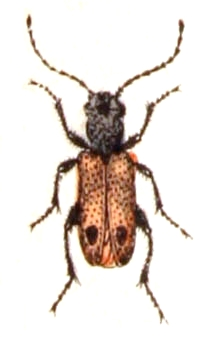
- Apalus bimaculatus

Scientific classification
- Kingdom: Animalia
- Phylum: Arthropoda
- Clade: Pancrustacea
- Class: Insecta
- Order: Coleoptera
- Suborder: Polyphaga
- Infraorder: Cucujiformia
- Family: Meloidae
- Tribe: Sitarini
- Genus: Apalus; Fabricius, 1775

Type species
- Meloe bimaculatus Linnaeus, 1767

Synonyms
- Apalomus Rafinesque, 1815; Corioligiton Marseul, 1879; Criolis Mulsant, 1858; Criolus Wellman, 1910; Deratus Motschulsky, 1848; Hapalpus Wellman, 1910; Hapalus Illiger, 1801; Sitaropsis Yablokov-Khnzoryan, 1958

= Apalus =

Genus of beetles

Apalus is a genus of blister beetle from the family Meloidae. The species within the genus Apalus are parasitoids of solitary bees of the families Colletidae and Anthophoridae.

== Species ==
The following species are classified under the genus Apalus:

- Apalus bimaculatus (Linnaeus, 1761)
- Apalus binaevus (Prochazka, 1892)
- Apalus bipunctatus Germar, 1817
- Apalus creticus (Frivaldsky, 1877)
- Apalus gibbicollis Borchmann, 1910
- Apalus guerini (Mulsant, 1858)
- Apalus longipennis Pic, 1913
- Apalus montanus Escherich, 1897
- Apalus necydaleus (Pallas, 1782)
- Apalus spectabilis E.Frivaldsky, 1835
