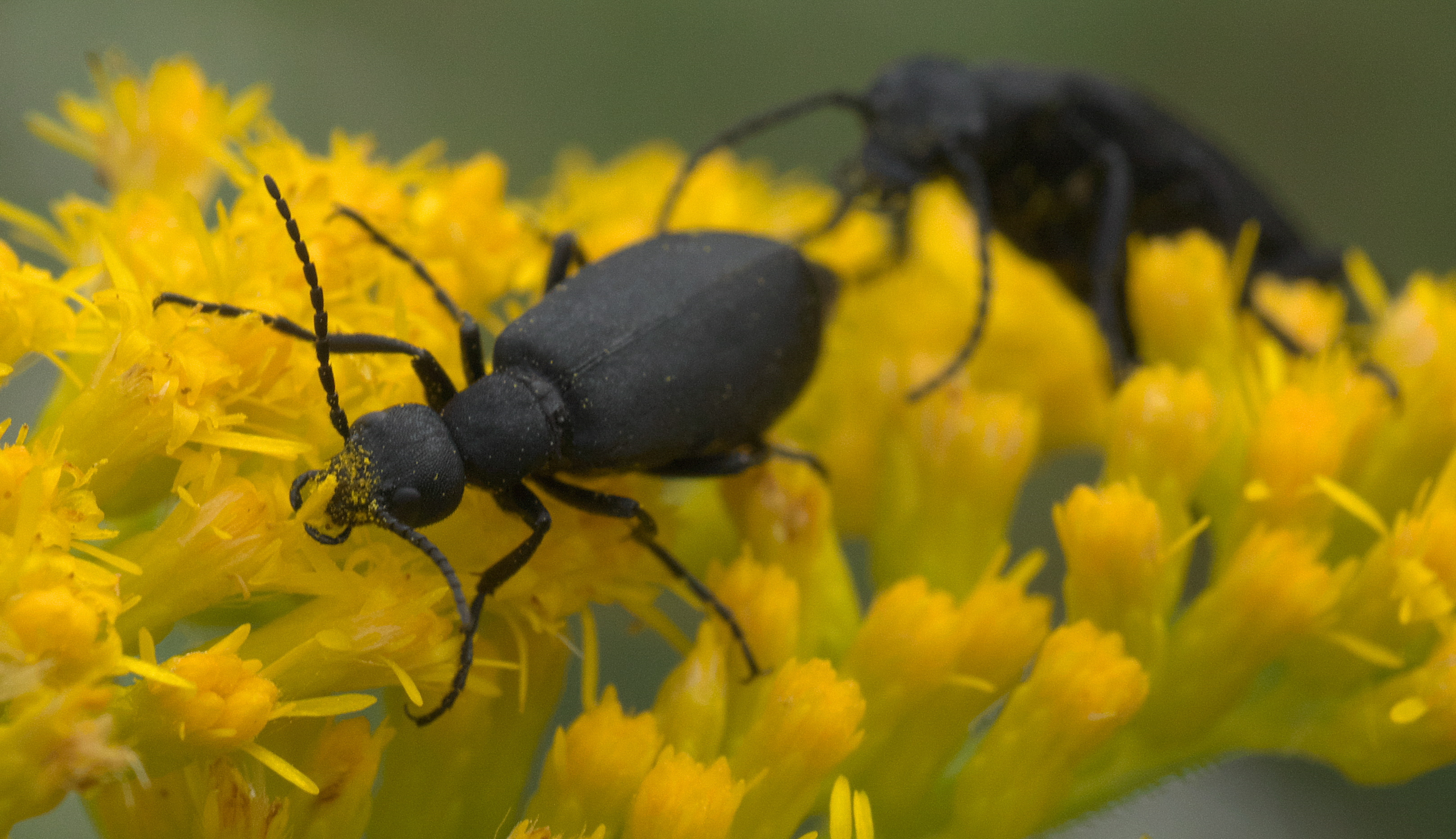

Scientific classification
- Kingdom: Animalia
- Phylum: Arthropoda
- Clade: Pancrustacea
- Class: Insecta
- Order: Coleoptera
- Suborder: Polyphaga
- Infraorder: Cucujiformia
- Family: Meloidae
- Subfamily: Meloinae
- Tribe: Epicautini
- Genus: Epicauta
- Species: E. pensylvanica

Binomial name
- Epicauta pensylvanica (De Geer, 1775)

Synonyms
- Epicauta pennsylvanica

= Epicauta pensylvanica =

Species of beetle

Epicauta pensylvanica, known generally as the black blister beetle or black aster bug, is a species of burning blister beetle in the family Meloidae.

The species name is sometimes spelled with a double "n", "Epicauta pennsylvanica".

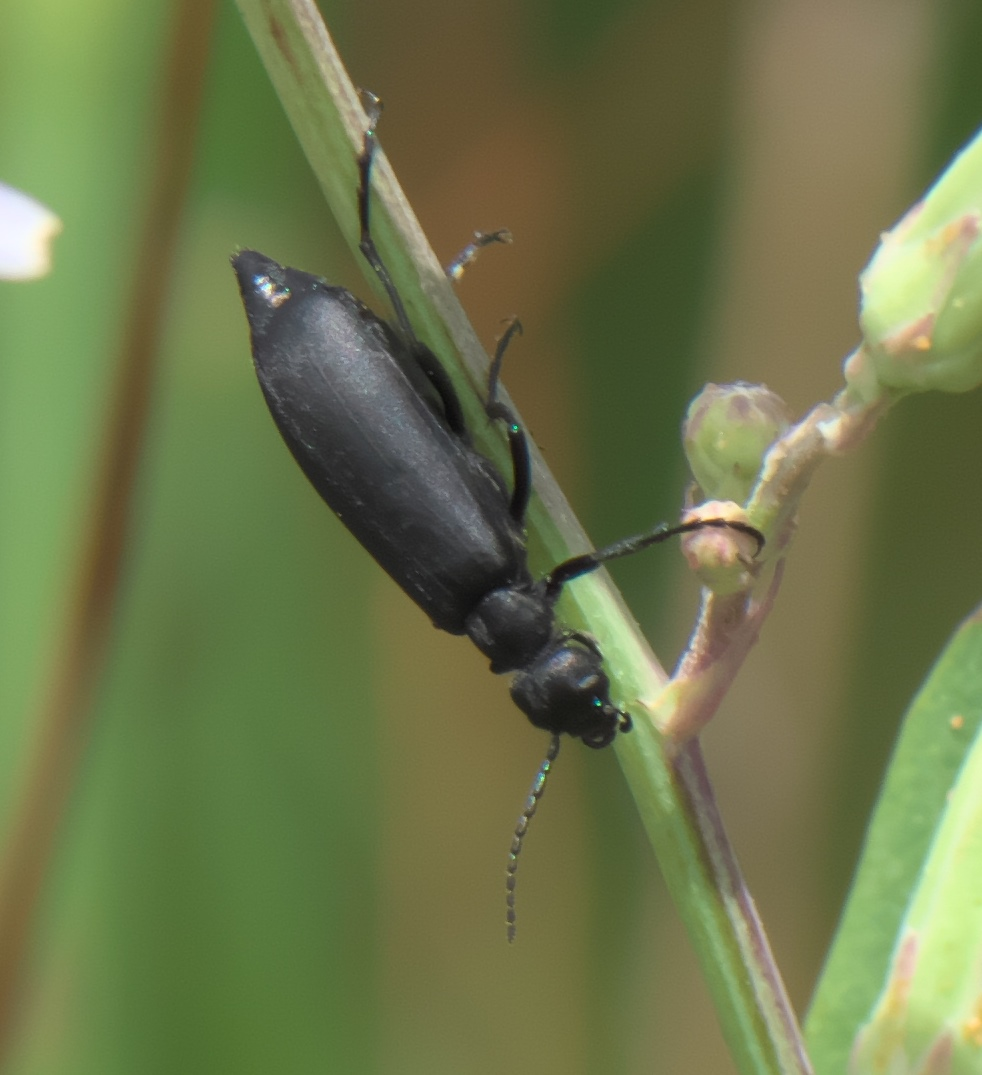
Epicauta pensylvanica
