= Cyaneolytta =

Scientific classification
- Kingdom: Animalia
- Phylum: Arthropoda
- Clade: Pancrustacea
- Class: Insecta
- Order: Coleoptera
- Suborder: Polyphaga
- Infraorder: Cucujiformia
- Family: Meloidae
- Tribe: Lyttini
- Genus: Cyaneolytta

Genus of beetles

Cyaneolytta is a genus of beetles in the tribe Lyttini of the family blister beetles.

== Taxonomy ==
Cyaneolytta contains the following species:

- Cyaneolytta laminicornis
- Cyaneolytta episcopalis
- Cyaneolytta depressicornis
- Cyaneolytta sulcata
- Cyaneolytta airensis
- Cyaneolytta gestroi
- Cyaneolytta affinis
- Cyaneolytta resplendens
- Cyaneolytta baulnyi
- Cyaneolytta atrocoerulea
- Cyaneolytta kulzeri
- Cyaneolytta acteon
- Cyaneolytta coeruleata
- Cyaneolytta amethystina
- Cyaneolytta maindroni
- Cyaneolytta signifrons
- Cyaneolytta suahela
- Cyaneolytta maculifrons
- Cyaneolytta coerulea
- Cyaneolytta basicollis
- Cyaneolytta granulipennis
