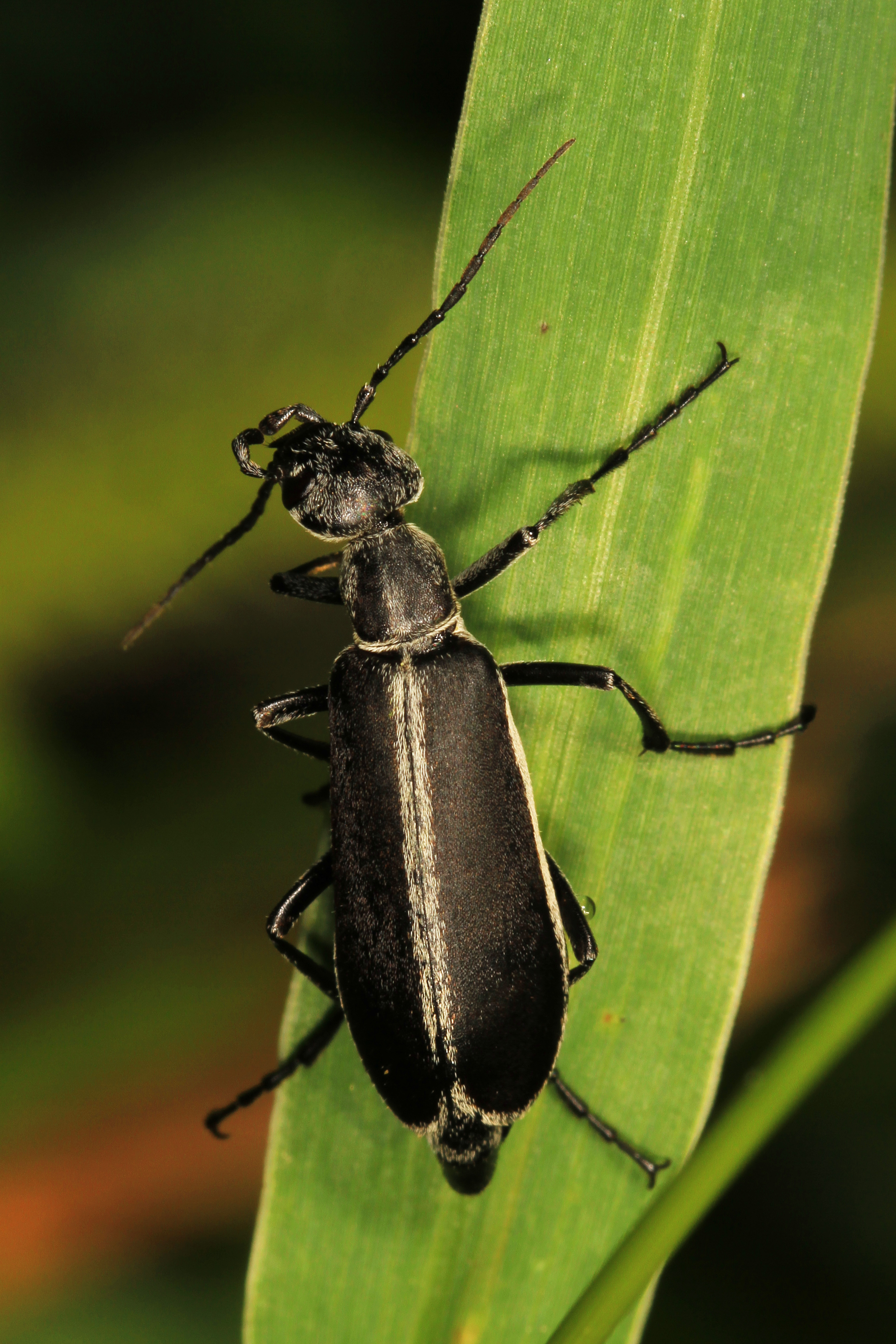

Scientific classification
- Kingdom: Animalia
- Phylum: Arthropoda
- Clade: Pancrustacea
- Class: Insecta
- Order: Coleoptera
- Suborder: Polyphaga
- Infraorder: Cucujiformia
- Family: Meloidae
- Tribe: Epicautini
- Genus: Epicauta
- Species: E. funebris

Binomial name
- Epicauta funebris Horn, 1873

= Epicauta funebris =

Species of beetle

Epicauta funebris, known generally as the margined blister beetle or ebony blister beetle, is a species of blister beetle in the family Meloidae. It is found in North America. It is similar in color to Epicauta cinerea.

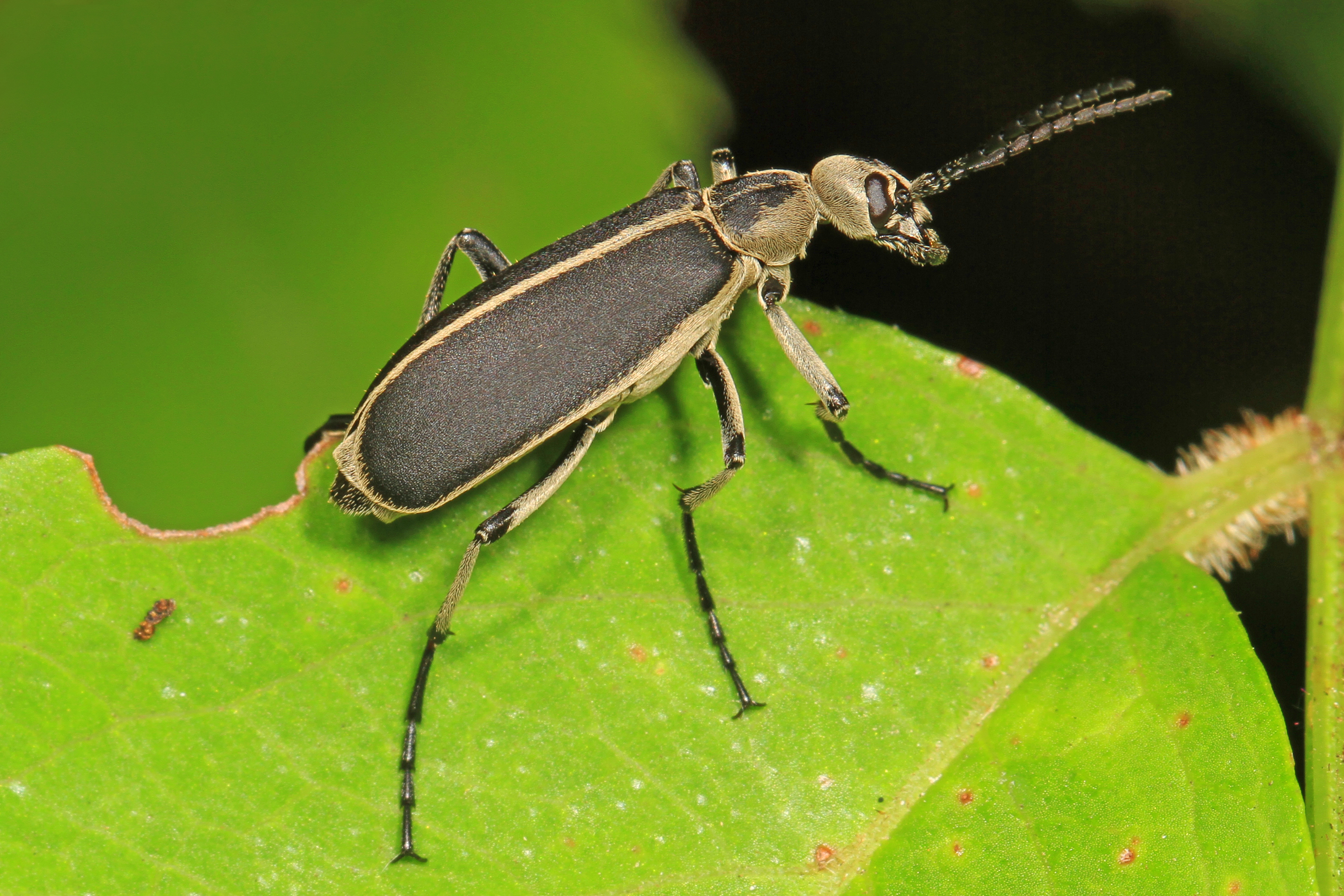
Margined blister beetle, Epicauta funebris

Female margined blister beetle pursued by multiple males.
