= Tetraonyx =

Scientific classification
- Kingdom: Animalia
- Phylum: Arthropoda
- Class: Insecta
- Order: Coleoptera
- Suborder: Polyphaga
- Infraorder: Cucujiformia
- Family: Meloidae
- Genus: Tetraonyx; Latreille, 1805

Genus of beetles

Tetraonyx is a genus of blister beetles in the family Meloidae. There are about nine described species in Tetraonyx.

== Species ==
These nine species belong to the genus Tetraonyx:

- Tetraonyx albipilosa Van Dyke, 1929^{i c g}
- Tetraonyx bipunctata Audinet-Serville, 1825^{g}
- Tetraonyx femoralis Dugès, 1869^{i c g}
- Tetraonyx fulva LeConte, 1853^{i c g b}
- Tetraonyx lemoulti Pic, 1915^{g}
- Tetraonyx ochraceoguttatus Duges, 1881^{g}
- Tetraonyx quadrimaculata (Fabricius, 1792)^{i c g b}
- Tetraonyx rufus Duges, 1869^{g}
- Tetraonyx undulata Haag-Rutenberg, 1879^{g}

Data sources: i = ITIS, c = Catalogue of Life, g = GBIF, b = Bugguide.net
