= Zonitolytta =

Scientific classification
- Kingdom: Animalia
- Phylum: Arthropoda
- Clade: Pancrustacea
- Class: Insecta
- Order: Coleoptera
- Suborder: Polyphaga
- Infraorder: Cucujiformia
- Family: Meloidae
- Genus: Zonitolytta; Pic, 1927
- Species: Z. robusta

Binomial name
- Zonitolytta robusta Pic, 1927

Genus of beetles

Zonitolytta is a monotypic genus of blister beetle in the family Meloidae. Its only species, Zonitolytta robusta, is known for its unique features and characteristics.

== Geographical distribution ==
Zonitolytta robusta is a beetle that lives in South America, specifically in Argentina, Paraguay, and Brazil. It adapts to different environments, from deserts to forests, and survives in various climactic conditions.
