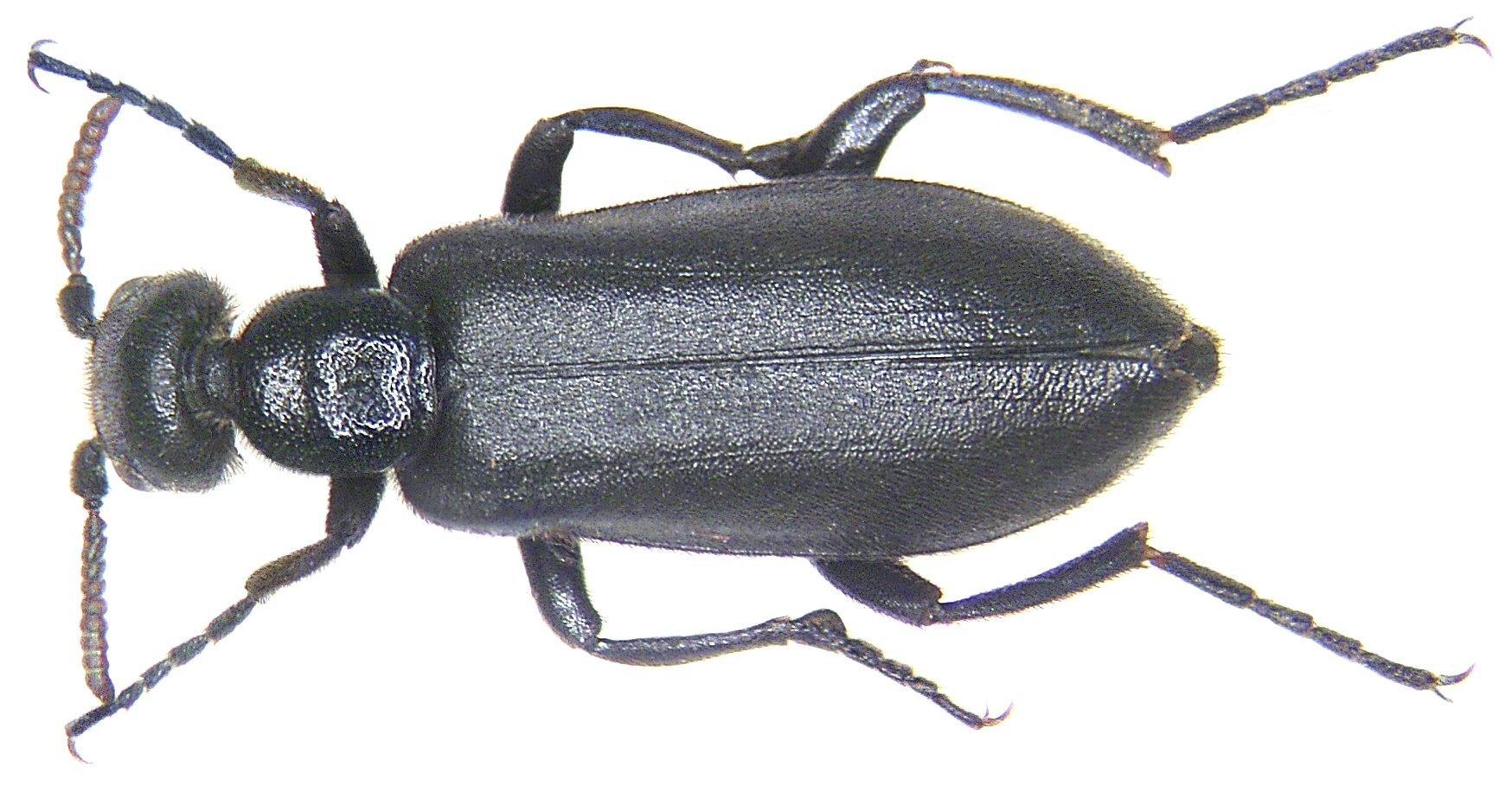
- Oenas afer

Scientific classification
- Kingdom: Animalia
- Phylum: Arthropoda
- Class: Insecta
- Order: Coleoptera
- Suborder: Polyphaga
- Infraorder: Cucujiformia
- Family: Meloidae
- Tribe: Lyttini
- Genus: Oenas; Latreille, 1802

Type species
- Meloe afer Linnaeus, 1767

= Oenas =

Genus of beetle

Oenas is a genus of blister beetle related to the well-known Lytta vesicatoria (a.k.a. "Spanish Fly"). The genus is Mediterranean in its distribution (from Morocco & Spain, east to Caucasus, Palestine & Iran).
