= Spastonyx =

Scientific classification
- Domain: Eukaryota
- Kingdom: Animalia
- Phylum: Arthropoda
- Class: Insecta
- Order: Coleoptera
- Suborder: Polyphaga
- Infraorder: Cucujiformia
- Family: Meloidae
- Subfamily: Meloinae
- Tribe: Meloini
- Genus: Spastonyx; Selander, 1954

Genus of beetles

Spastonyx is a genus of blister beetles in the family Meloidae. There are at least two described species in Spastonyx.

== Species ==
These two species belong to the genus Spastonyx:

- Spastonyx macswaini (Selander, 1954)
- Spastonyx nemognathoides (Horn, 1870)
