= Diaphorocera =

Scientific classification
- Kingdom: Animalia
- Phylum: Arthropoda
- Class: Insecta
- Order: Coleoptera
- Suborder: Polyphaga
- Infraorder: Cucujiformia
- Family: Meloidae
- Genus: Diaphorocera; Heyden, 1863

Type species
- Diaphorocera hemprichi Heyden, 1863

Diversity
- About 10 species

Genus of beetles

Diaphorocera is a genus of blister beetles belonging to the family Meloidae. The genus contains 10 species. All species are restricted to Saharo-Sindian regions such as Palestine and Israel, Northern Africa, southern Iran and Arabian Peninsula.

All members have metallic green-blue body, extremely modified male antennae and yellow-orange colored legs, antennae and mouthparts.

== Taxonomy ==
In 1895, Bedel published the first key to the species Diaphorocera and it was revised by Zoltán Kaszab in 1951. In 1954 and 1983 Kocher and Kaszab respectively described one new species and one new subspecies. Phylogenetic relationships of Diaphorocera within Cerocomini were never defined. Kaszab division to genera was based on the base of the number of antennomeres.

== Species ==
- Diaphorocera carinicollis
- Diaphorocera chrysoprasis
- Diaphorocera hemprichi
  - Diaphorocera hemprichi hemprichi
  - Diaphorocera hemprichi saudita
- Diaphorocera johnsoni
- Diaphorocera kerimii
- Diaphorocera neglecta
- Diaphorocera obscuritarsis
- Diaphorocera peyerimhoffi
- Diaphorocera promelaena
- Diaphorocera sicardi
