= Linsleya =

Scientific classification
- Domain: Eukaryota
- Kingdom: Animalia
- Phylum: Arthropoda
- Class: Insecta
- Order: Coleoptera
- Suborder: Polyphaga
- Infraorder: Cucujiformia
- Family: Meloidae
- Subfamily: Meloinae
- Tribe: Epicautini
- Genus: Linsleya; MacSwain, 1951

Genus of beetles

Linsleya is a genus of blister beetles in the family Meloidae. There are about five described species in Linsleya.

== Species ==
These five species belong to the genus Linsleya:

- Linsleya californica Selander, 1955
- Linsleya compressicornis (Horn, 1870)
- Linsleya convexa (LeConte, 1853)
- Linsleya sphaericollis (Say, 1824) (ash blister beetle)
- Linsleya suavissima (Wellman, 1910)
