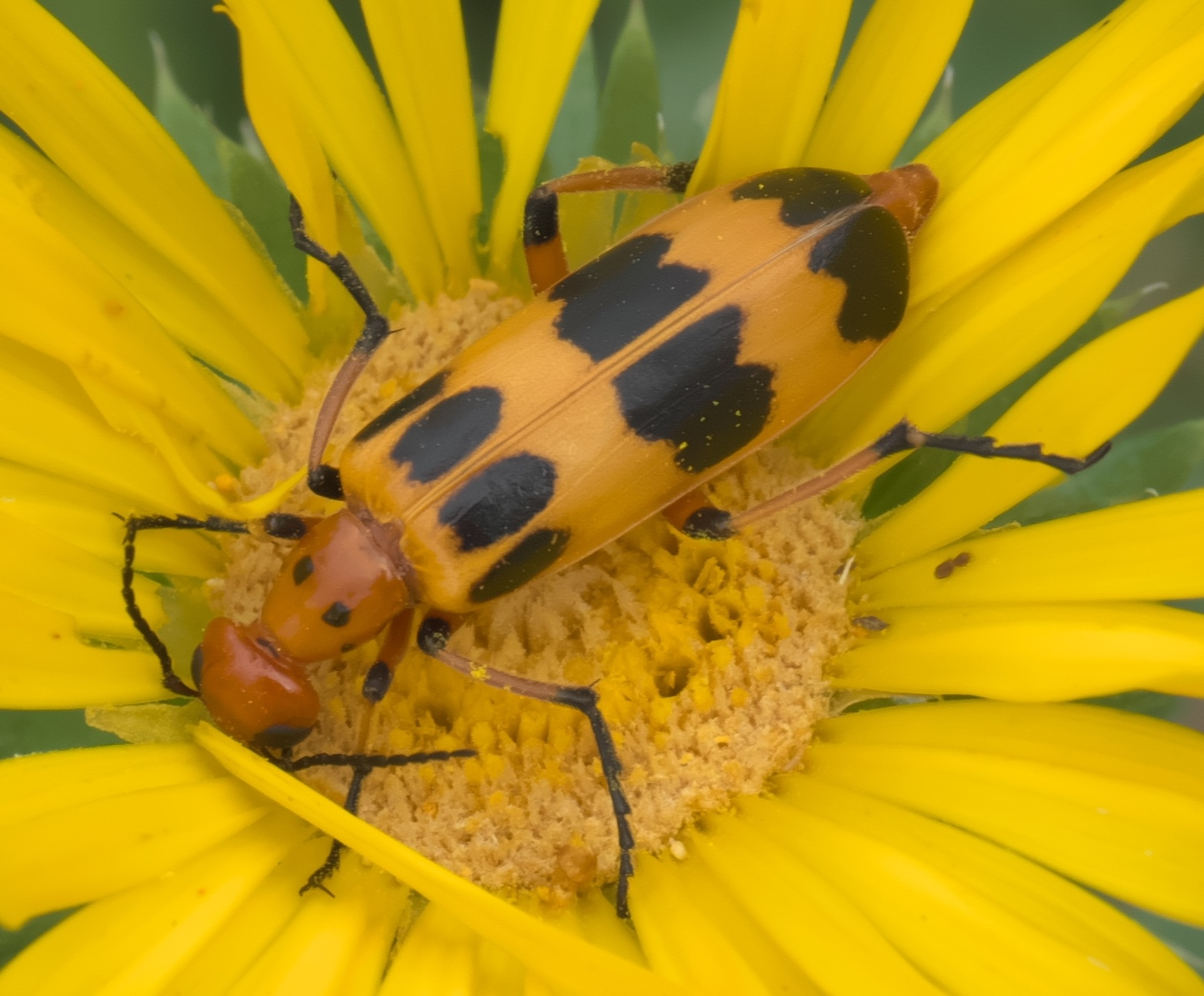

Scientific classification
- Kingdom: Animalia
- Phylum: Arthropoda
- Class: Insecta
- Order: Coleoptera
- Suborder: Polyphaga
- Infraorder: Cucujiformia
- Family: Meloidae
- Subfamily: Meloinae
- Tribe: Pyrotini
- Genus: Pyrota; Dejean, 1834

= Pyrota =

Genus of beetles

Pyrota is a genus of blister beetles in the family Meloidae. There are at least 30 described species in Pyrota.

== Species ==
These 31 species belong to the genus Pyrota:

- Pyrota akhurstiana Horn, 1891^{i c g b}
- Pyrota bilineata Horn, 1885^{i c g b}
- Pyrota centenaria Breyer & Trant, 1910^{i c g b}
- Pyrota concinna Casey, 1891^{i c g b}
- Pyrota deceptiva Selander, 1963^{i c g b}
- Pyrota discoidea LeConte, 1853^{i c g b}
- Pyrota engelmanni LeConte, 1847^{i c g b}
- Pyrota fasciata Selander, 1963^{i c g b}
- Pyrota hirticollis Champion, 1891^{i c g}
- Pyrota insulata (LeConte, 1858)^{i c g b} (yellow-crescent blister beetle)
- Pyrota invita Horn, 1885^{i c g b}
- Pyrota lineata (Olivier, 1795)^{b}
- Pyrota mariarum Champion, 1891^{i c g}
- Pyrota mutata^{b}
- Pyrota mylabrina Chevrolat, 1834^{i c g b}
- Pyrota nigra Selander, 1983^{i c g}
- Pyrota nigrovittata^{b}
- Pyrota nobilis (Haag-Rutenberg, 1880)^{i c g}
- Pyrota obliquefascia Schaeffer, 1908^{b}
- Pyrota pacifica Selander, 1982^{i c g}
- Pyrota palpalis Champion, 1891^{i c g b} (Charlie Brown blister beetle)
- Pyrota perversa Dillon, 1952^{i c g b}
- Pyrota plagiata (Haag-Rutenberg, 1880)^{i c g b}
- Pyrota postica LeConte, 1858^{i c g b}
- Pyrota punctata Casey, 1891^{i c g b}
- Pyrota quadrinervata (Herrera and Mendoza, 1866)^{i c g}
- Pyrota rugulipennis Champion, 1891^{i c g}
- Pyrota sinuata (Olivier, 1795)^{i c g b}
- Pyrota tenuicostatis (Dugès, 1869)^{i c g b} (red-margined blister beetle)
- Pyrota terrestris Selander, 1963^{i c g}
- Pyrota trochanterica Horn, 1894^{b}
- Pyrota victoria Dillon, 1952^{i c g}

Data sources: i = ITIS, c = Catalogue of Life, g = GBIF, b = Bugguide.net
