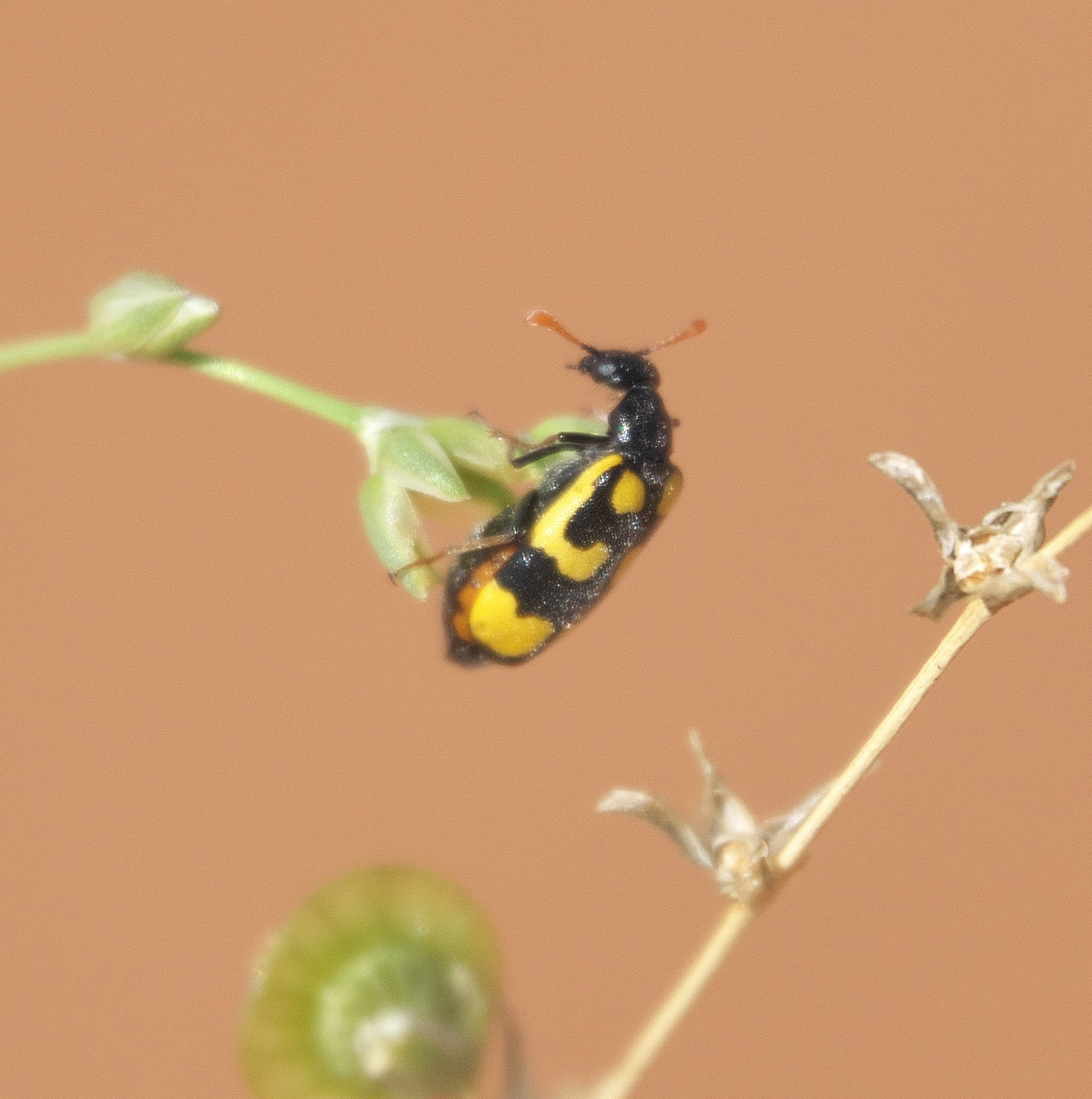
- Paractenodia freyi, Namibia

Scientific classification
- Kingdom: Animalia
- Phylum: Arthropoda
- Class: Insecta
- Order: Coleoptera
- Suborder: Polyphaga
- Infraorder: Cucujiformia
- Family: Meloidae
- Subfamily: Meloinae
- Tribe: Mylabrini
- Genus: Paractenodia; Péringuey, 1904

= Paractenodia =

Genus of beetles

Paractenodia is a genus of blister beetles in the family Meloidae. There are about five described species in Paractenodia.

All five known species are found in Namibia. Paractenodia namaquensis and parva are also found in South Africa. Paractenodia damarensis is also found in the Kalahari of western Botswana.

== Species ==
These five species belong to the genus Paractenodia:

- Paractenodia damarensis Kaszab, 1951 - Botswana and Namibia
- Paractenodia freyi Kaszab, 1955 - western Namibia (endemic)
- Paractenodia glabra Kaszab, 1969 - western Namibia (endemic)
- Paractenodia namaquensis Kaszab, 1955 - Namibia and northwestern South Africa
- Paractenodia parva Péringuey, 1904 - southern Namibia and northwestern South Africa

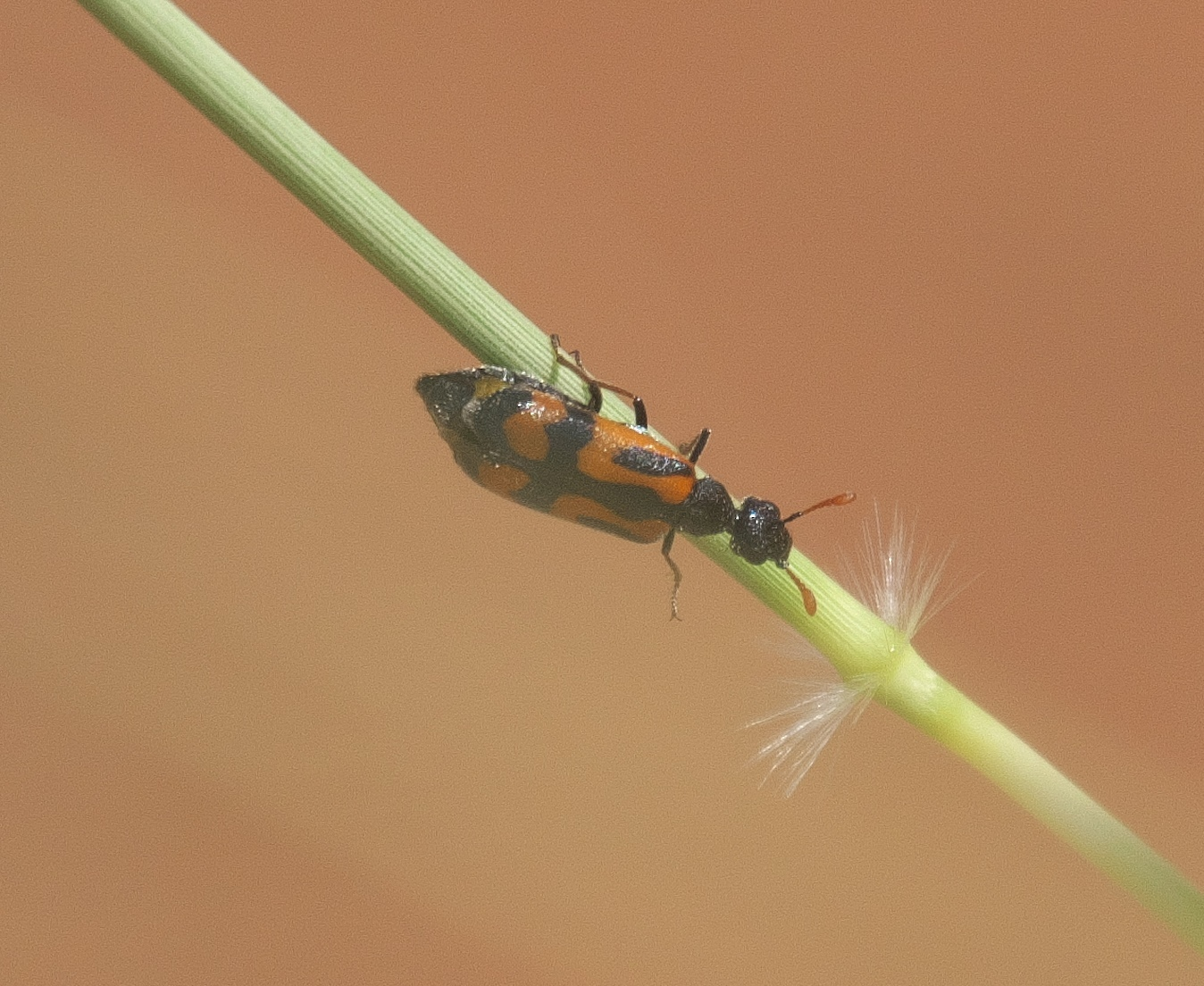
Paractenodia namaquensis, Namibia
