= Pyrota punctata =

Scientific classification
- Kingdom: Animalia
- Phylum: Arthropoda
- Class: Insecta
- Order: Coleoptera
- Suborder: Polyphaga
- Infraorder: Cucujiformia
- Family: Meloidae
- Genus: Pyrota
- Species: P. punctata

Binomial name
- Pyrota punctata Casey, 1891

Species of beetle

Pyrota punctata is a species of blister beetle in the family Meloidae. It is found in Central America and North America.
