= Cantarella =

Poison allegedly used by the House of Borgia

Cantarella was a poison allegedly used by the Borgias during the papacy of Pope Alexander VI. It may have been arsenic, and according to some modern sources it came in the shape of "a white powder with a pleasant taste", and was sprinkled on food or in wine. If it did exist, it left no trace in the works of contemporary writers.

== Etymology ==
The exact origin of the term cantarella is unknown. It may have been derived from kantharos (Ancient Greek: κάνθαρος), a type of ancient Greek cup used for drinking, or the Neo-Latin word cantharellus ('small cup'), in reference to the cups in which the poison would have been served. The word may also be related to kantharis (Ancient Greek: κάνθαρις), referring to the Spanish fly and other blister beetles that secrete cantharidin, a substance that is poisonous in large doses.
