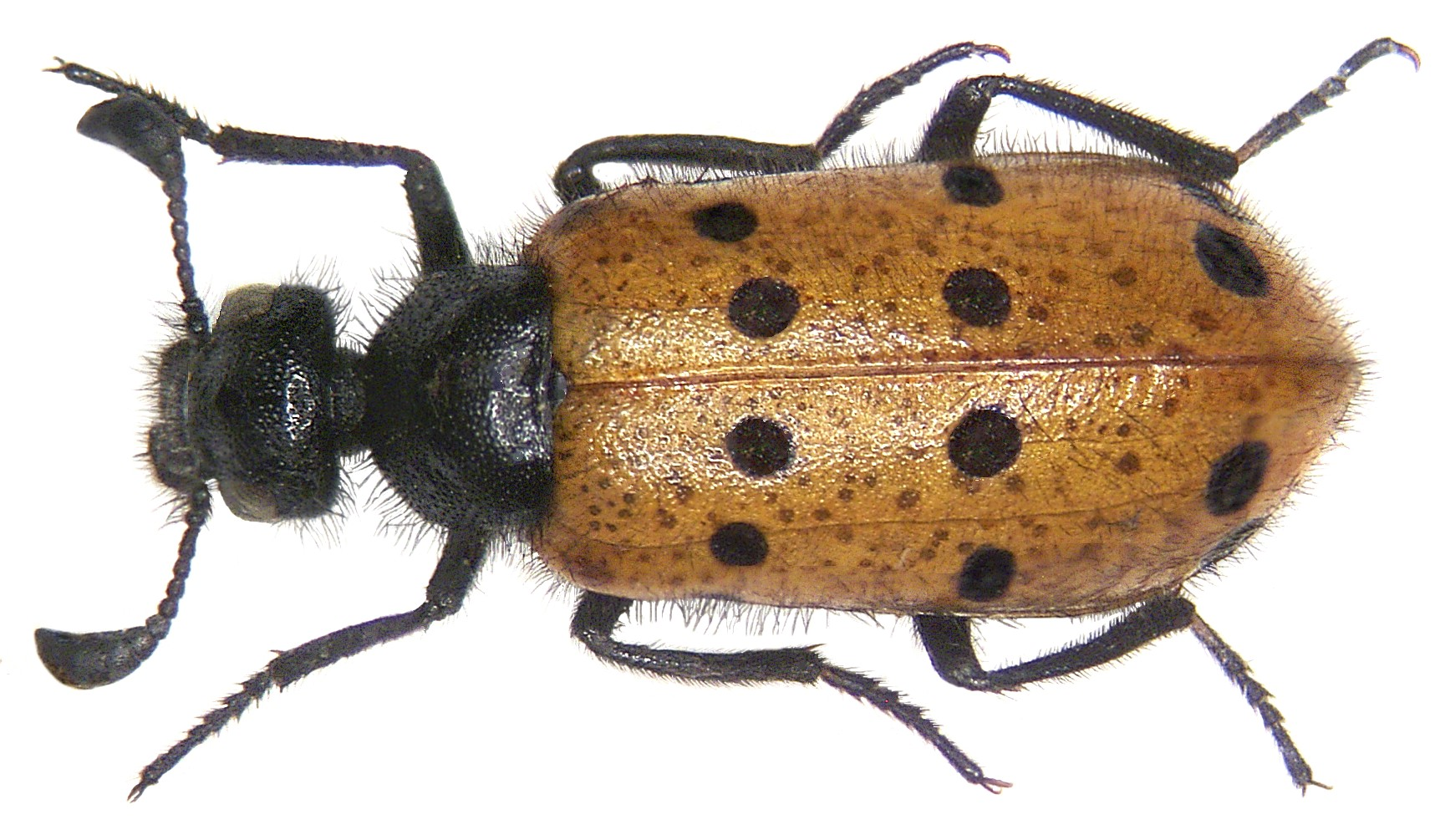
- Actenodia distincta

Scientific classification
- Domain: Eukaryota
- Kingdom: Animalia
- Phylum: Arthropoda
- Class: Insecta
- Order: Coleoptera
- Suborder: Polyphaga
- Infraorder: Cucujiformia
- Family: Meloidae
- Genus: Actenodia; Laporte de Castelnau in Brullé, 1840

= Actenodia =

Genus of beetles

Actenodia is a genus of blister beetles in the family Meloidae. The genus was named and described by Francis de Laporte de Castelnau in 1840.

== Species ==
The genus was revised in 2008, and contains the following 18 species:

- Actenodia billbergi (Gyllenhal, 1817)
- Actenodia carpanetoi Bologna & Di Giulio, 2008
- Actenodia cerrutii Bologna, 1978
- Actenodia chrysomelina Erichson, 1843
- Actenodia confluens (Reiche, 1866)
- Actenodia curtula Fähraeus, 1870
- Actenodia denticulata (Marseul, 1872)
- Actenodia distincta (Chevrolat, 1840)
- Actenodia guttata Laporte de Castelnau, 1840
- Actenodia lata (Reiche, 1866)
- Actenodia luteofasciata Pic, 1929
- Actenodia mateui (Pardo Alcaide, 1963)
- Actenodia mirabilis Kaszab, 1952
- Actenodia perfuga (Dvorák, 1993)
- Actenodia peyroni (Reiche, 1866)
- Actenodia septempunctata (Baudi di Selve, 1878)
- Actenodia suturifera (Pic, 1896)
- Actenodia unimaculata Pic, 1908
