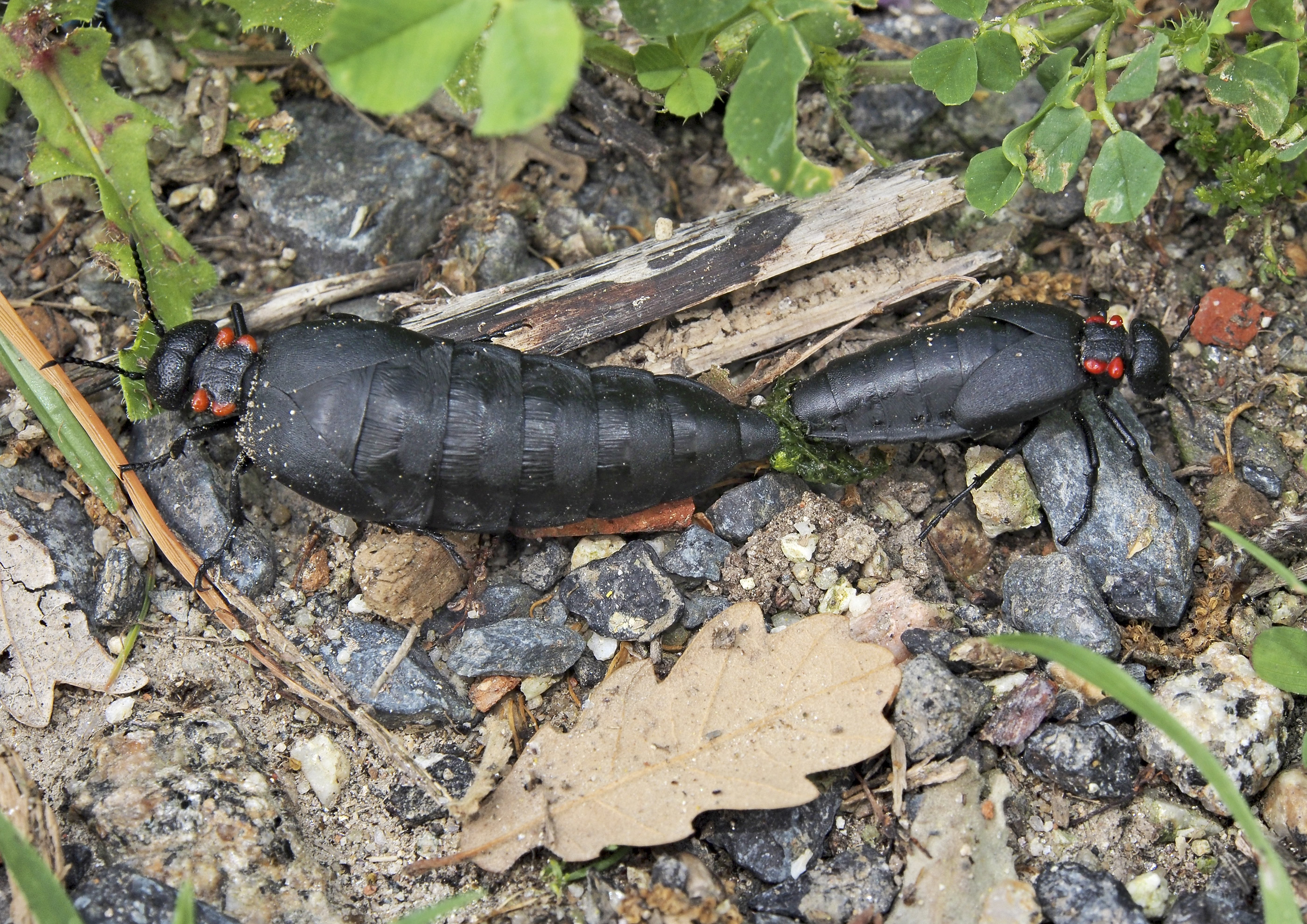

Scientific classification
- Kingdom: Animalia
- Phylum: Arthropoda
- Class: Insecta
- Order: Coleoptera
- Suborder: Polyphaga
- Infraorder: Cucujiformia
- Family: Meloidae
- Genus: Physomeloe; Reitter, 1911
- Species: P. corallifer

Binomial name
- Physomeloe corallifer Germar, 1818

Synonyms
- Meloe corallifer

= Physomeloe corallifer =

Species of blister beetle

Physomeloe corallifer is a species of blister beetle native to the Iberian Peninsula, it is the only recognised species in the genus Physomeloe.

== Description ==
As larvae, Physomeloe corallifer have long hairy bodies, with thin legs, large powerful mandibles and short antennae. Larvae are very rarely observed in the wild as they spend their time underground.

As adults they possess short elytra, barely covering a third of their massive abdomens. Their pronotum are adorned by four coral red spots, this is where the species derives its name from,corallifer, meaning "carrying or possessing coral"; these marks have an aposematic function, warning predators of the danger posed by trying to eat them, as like other blister beetles they can secrete hemolymph containing cantharidin, a highly irritating substance that can cause lesions to the skin and conjunctivitis in the eyes; this does not seem to deter great bustards, who eat them in small doses as a measure to self-medicate and expunge parasites. As it is the case with many insects, females are larger than males, measuring up to four centimetres.

== Reproduction ==
Much like other blister beetles, Physomeloe corallifer can parasitize other insects, typically bees. After mating, the female places the eggs beneath a growing plant; once they hatch the young larvae will climb up to the flowers where they wait for the arrival of a pollinator. They hold tightly to their host's legs until they unwittingly bring them to their nests, once there the beetles devour any eggs, larvae and stockpiled food. This parasitic quality leads to the majority of Physomeloe corallifer not making it to adulthood. Which plants it is they prefer is yet unknown, although Bologna and Aloisi reported spotting them near thistles.

== Distribution ==
They are endemic to the Iberian Peninsula, they are typically found around waterways in the Sistema Central and along the Douro's and Tagus' valleys, although less abundant in the latter. They have been sporadically reported in the southern parts of the peninsula, up to northern Andalucía. Adults are most active throughout the month of April much like their distant relative Berberomeloe majalis, the Red-striped Oil Beetle.
