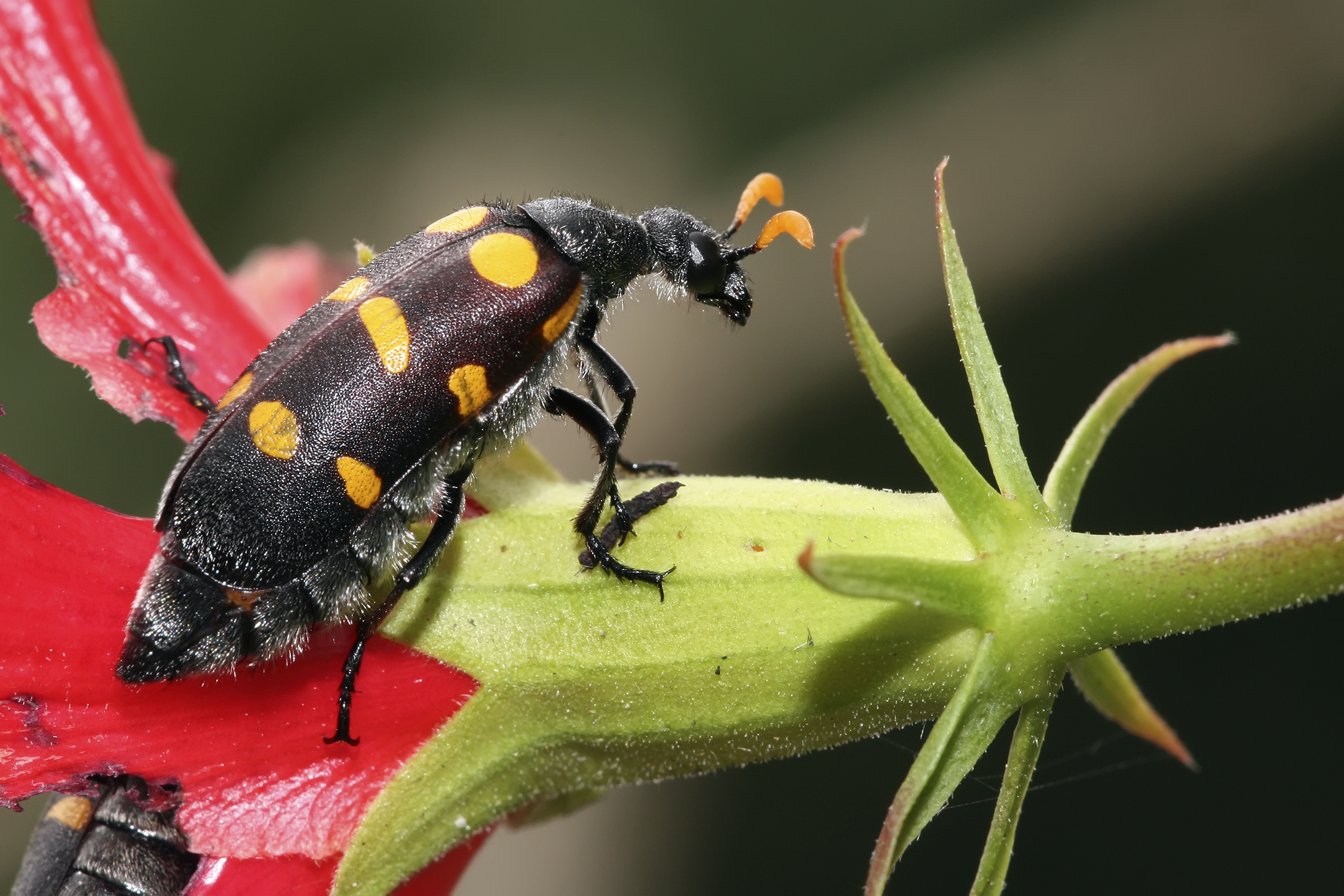
- Hycleus lugens

Scientific classification
- Kingdom: Animalia
- Phylum: Arthropoda
- Clade: Pancrustacea
- Class: Insecta
- Order: Coleoptera
- Suborder: Polyphaga
- Infraorder: Cucujiformia
- Superfamily: Tenebrionoidea
- Family: Meloidae; Gyllenhaal, 1810

Subfamilies
- Eleticinae; Meloinae; Nemognathinae; Tetraonycinae

= Blister beetle =

Blister beetle Temporal range: Cenomanian–Recent

Family of beetles

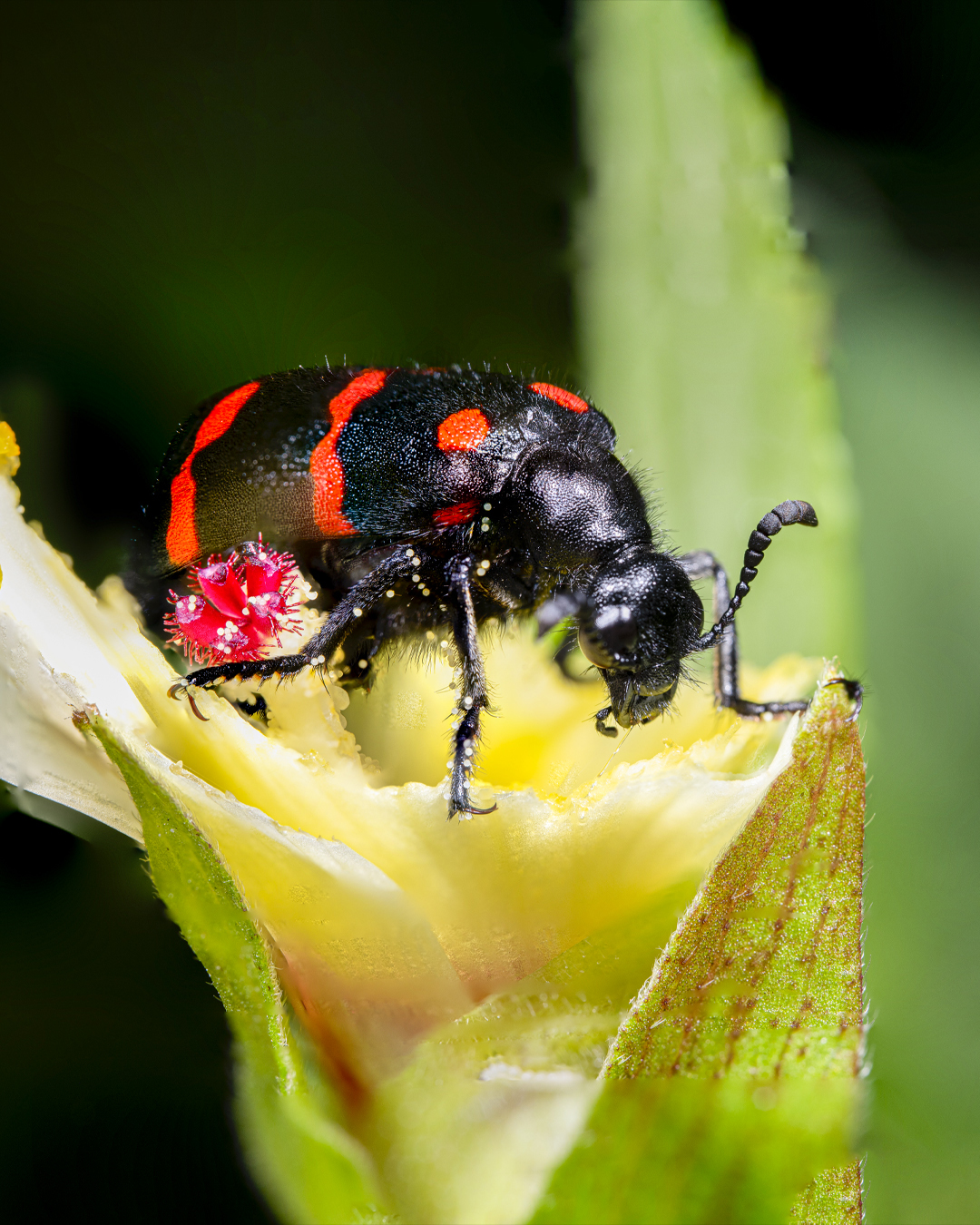
At Mumbai

Blister beetles are beetles of the family Meloidae, so called for their defensive secretion of a blistering agent, cantharidin. About 2,500 species are known worldwide. Many are conspicuous and some are aposematically colored, announcing their toxicity to would-be predators.

== Description ==
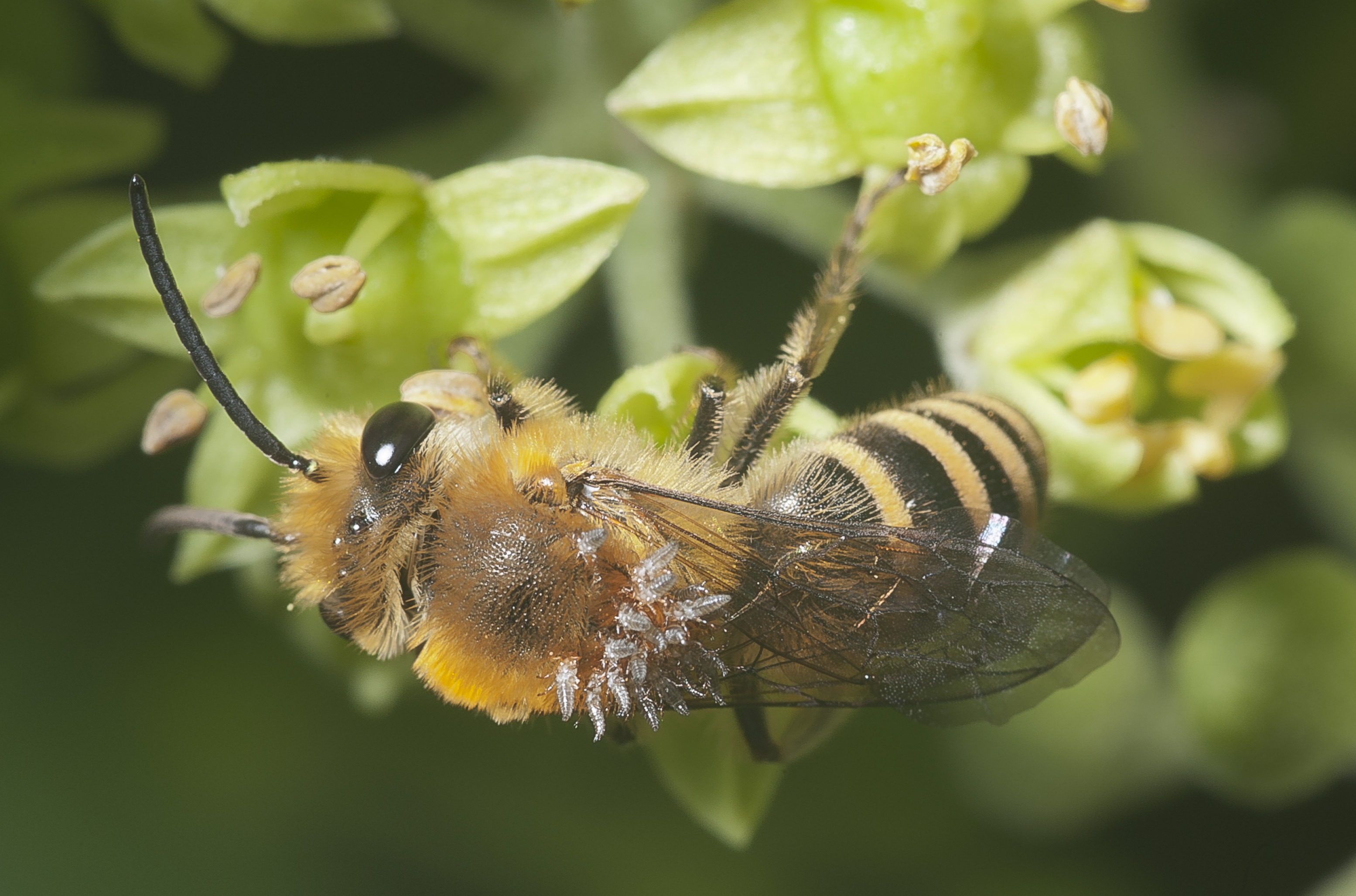
Ivy bee (Colletes hederae), carrying parasitic triungulins of Stenoria analis

Blister beetles are hypermetamorphic, going through several larval stages, the first of which is typically a mobile triungulin. The larvae are insectivorous, mainly attacking bees, though a few feed on grasshopper eggs. While sometimes considered parasitoids, in general, the meloid larva apparently consumes the immature host along with its provisions, and can often survive on the provisions alone; thus it is not an obligatory parasitoid, but rather a facultative parasitoid, or simply a kleptoparasite. The adults sometimes feed on flowers and leaves of plants of such diverse families as the Amaranthaceae, Asteraceae, Fabaceae, and Solanaceae.

Female margined blister beetle pursued by multiple males

Cantharidin, a poisonous chemical that causes blistering of the skin, is secreted as a defensive agent. It is used medically to remove warts and is collected for this purpose from species of the genera Mylabris and Lytta, especially Lytta vesicatoria, better known as "Spanish fly".

== Toxicity ==
Cantharidin from blister beetles has been used to create primarily aphrodisiacs but also poisons throughout history.

The largest genus, Epicauta, contains many species toxic to horses. A few beetles consumed in a single feeding of alfalfa hay may be lethal. In semiarid areas of the western United States, modern harvesting techniques may contribute to cantharidin content in harvested forage. The practice of hay conditioning, crushing the stalks to promote drying, also crushes any beetles present and causes the release of cantharidin into the fodder. Blister beetles are attracted to alfalfa and weeds during bloom. Reducing weeds and timing harvests before and after bloom are sound management practices. Using equipment without hay conditioners may reduce beetle mortality and allow them to escape before baling.

== Evolutionary history ==
The family is thought to have begun diversifying during the Early Cretaceous. The oldest fossil of the group is a larva (triangulin) found phoretic on a schizopterid bug from the mid Cretaceous Burmese amber, dated to around 99 million years ago.

== Biology ==
Blister beetles are known to attract bees with sex pheromones, then hitch a ride to their nests to dine on the bees' eggs. Ryan Alam of the Max Planck Institute for Chemical Ecology and colleagues analyzed the larvae of the European black oil beetle (Meloe proscarabaeus) --- they found a mix of molecules called monoterpenoids, rare in insects but common in flowers.

== Systematics ==
=== Subfamily Eleticinae ===
Tribe Derideini

- Anthicoxenus
- Deridea
- Iselma
- Iselmeletica

Tribe Morphozonitini

- Ceriselma
- Morphozonitis
- Steniselma

Tribe Eleticini

- Eletica

Tribe Spasticini

- Eospasta
- Protomeloe
- Spastica
- Xenospasta

=== Subfamily Meloinae ===
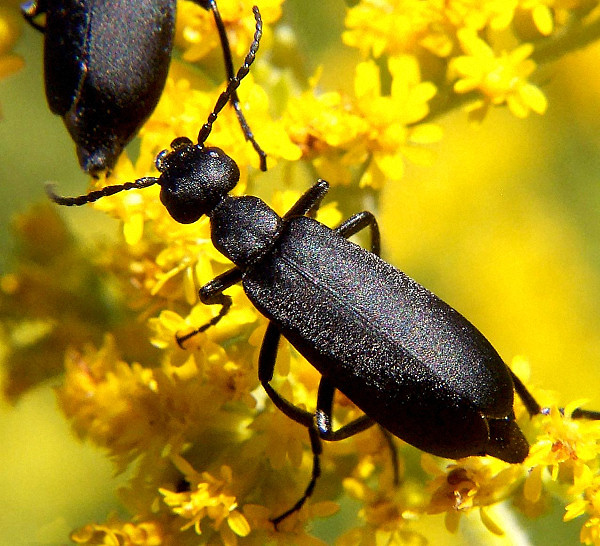
Black blister beetle, Epicauta pennsylvanica (Meloinae: Epicautini)

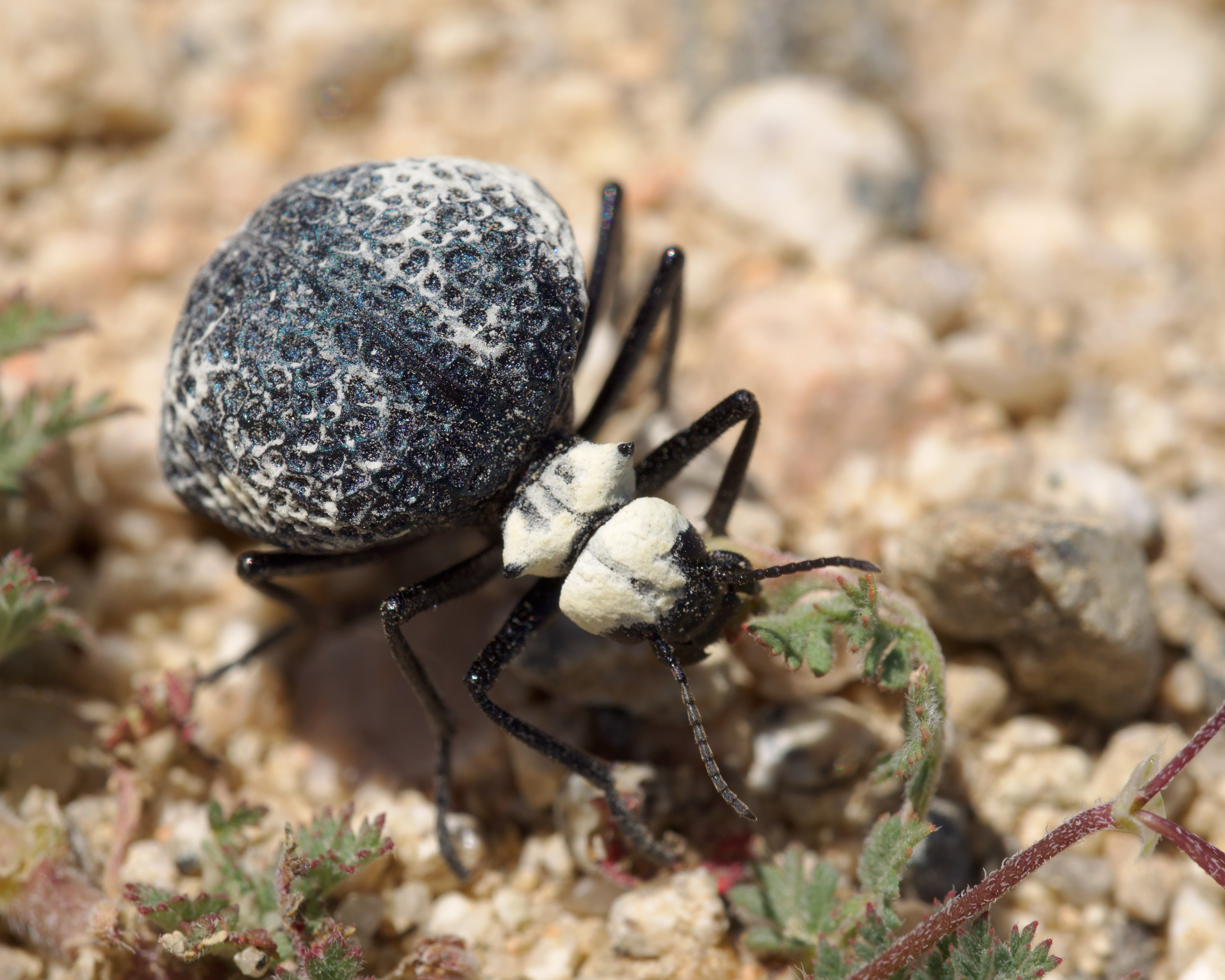
Cysteodemus armatus near Ridgecrest, California in the Mojave Desert: The white coating is cuticular wax, which can vary from white to yellow in this species .

Tribe Cerocomini

- Anisarthrocera
- Cerocoma
- Diaphorocera
- Rhampholyssa
- Rhampholyssodes

Tribe Epicautini

- Denierella
- Epicauta
- Linsleya
- Psalydolytta

Tribe Eupomphini

- Cordylospasta
- Cysteodemus
- Eupompha
- Megetra
- Phodaga
- Pleropasta
- Tegrodera

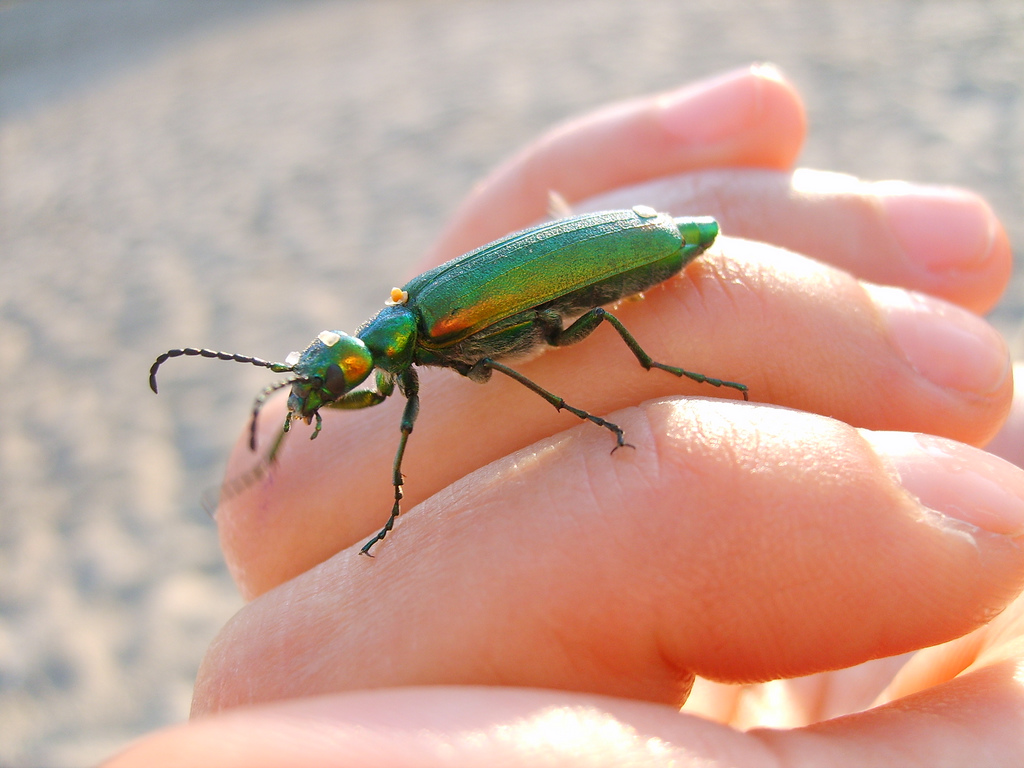
Blister beetles like this Lytta vesicatoria (Meloinae: Lyttini) can be safely handled, provided the animal is not startled, and allowed to move around freely. Otherwise, painful poisonings may occur.

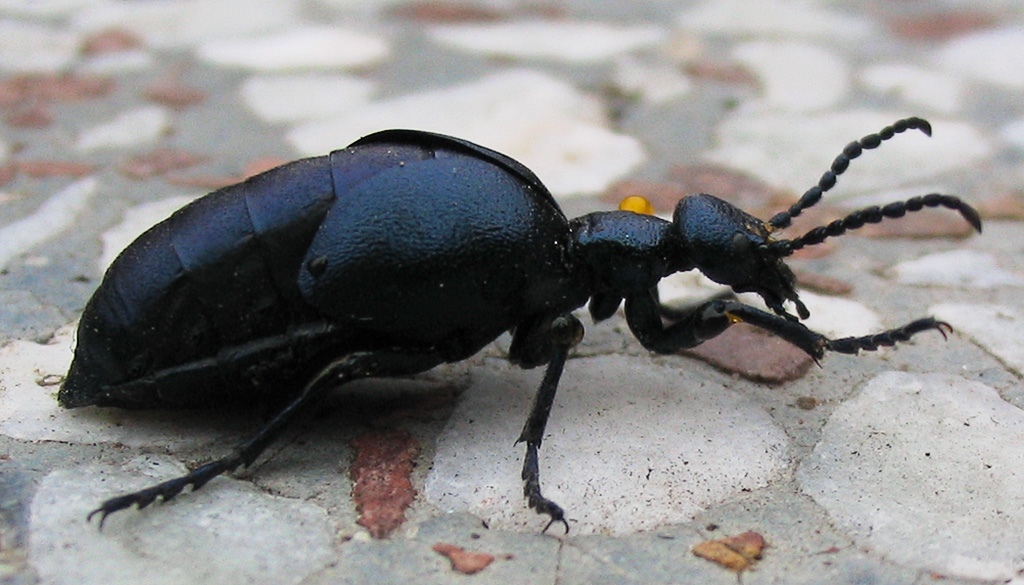
Meloe violaceus (Meloinae: Meloini): Note the drop of dark orange defensive fluid on its thorax.

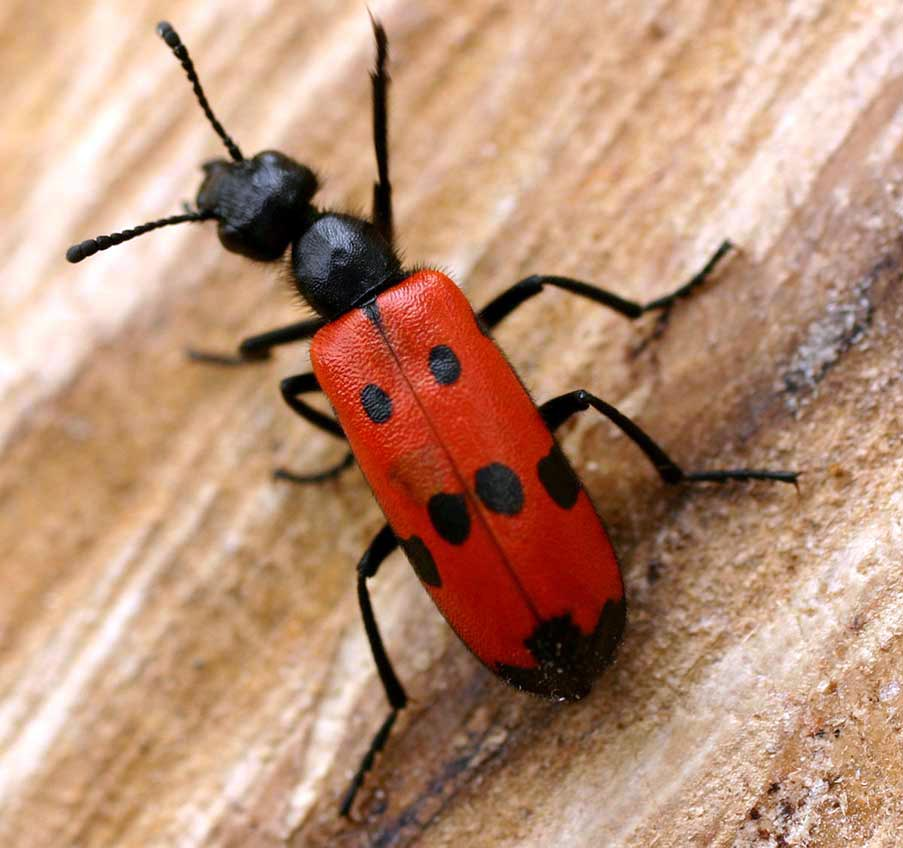
Mylabris quadripunctata (Meloinae: Mylabrini)

Tribe Lyttini

- Acrolytta
- Afrolytta
- Alosimus
- Berberomeloe
- Cabalia
- Dictyolytta
- Eolydus
- Epispasta
- Lagorina
- Lydomorphus
- Lydulus
- Lydus
- Lytta
- Lyttolydulus
- Lyttonyx
- Megalytta
- Muzimes
- Oenas
- Parameloe
- Paroenas
- Physomeloe
- Prionotolytta
- Prolytta
- Pseudosybaris
- Sybaris
- Teratolytta
- Tetraolytta
- Trichomeloe

Tribe Meloini

- Cyaneolytta
- Lyttomeloe
- Meloe
- Spastomeloe
- Spastonyx

Tribe Mylabrini

- Actenodia

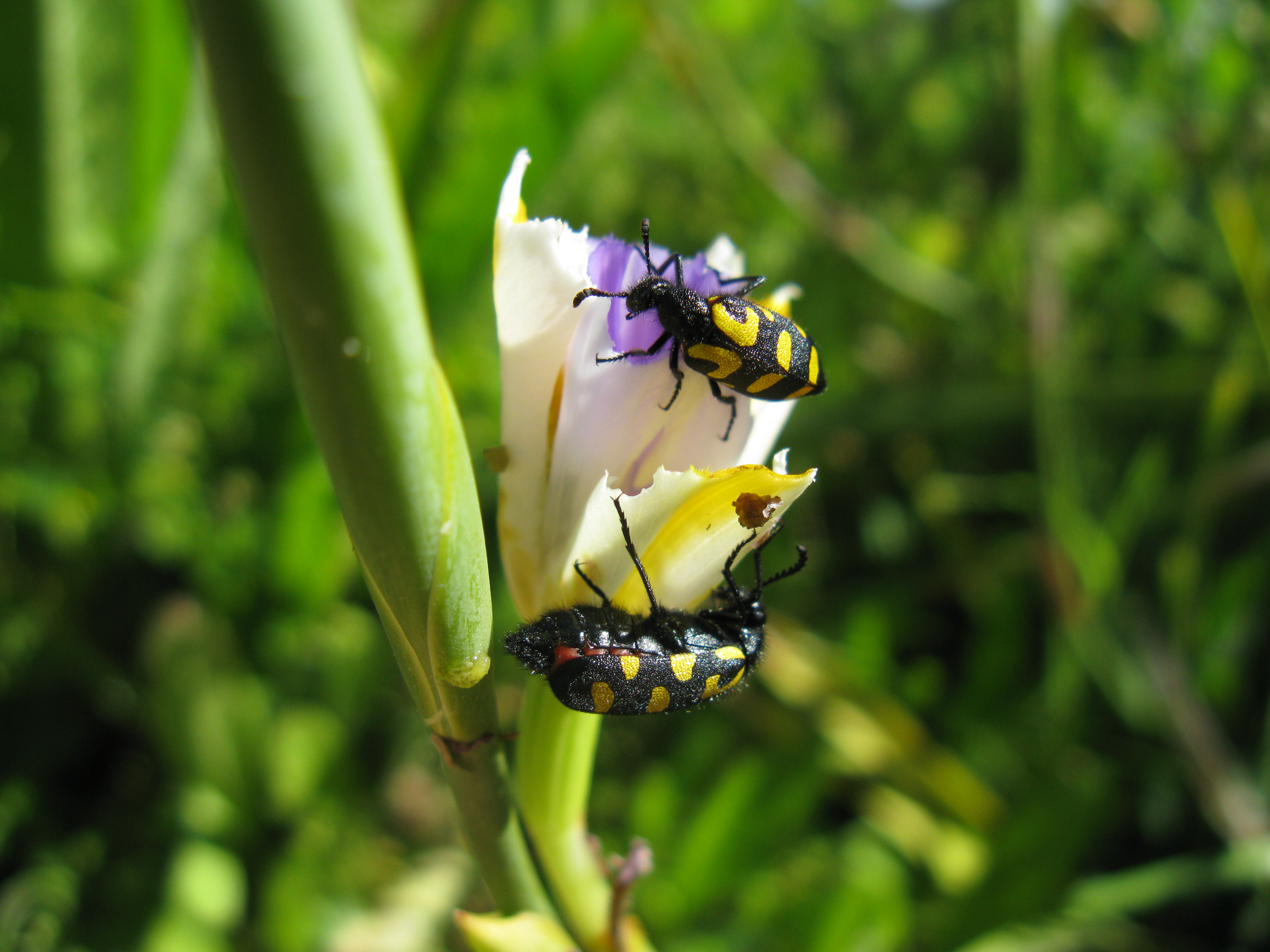
A yellow-and-black species of Actenodia, one of many known in South Africa as "CMR beetle"

- Ceroctis
- Croscherichia
- Hycleus
- Lydoceras
- Mimesthes
- Mylabris
- Paractenodia
- Pseudabris
- Semenovilia
- Xanthabris

Tribe Pyrotini

- Bokermannia
- Brasiliota
- Denierota
- Glaphyrolytta
- Lyttamorpha
- Picnoseus
- Pseudopyrota
- Pyrota
- Wagneronota

Genera incertae sedis

- Australytta
- Calydus
- Gynapteryx
- Oreomeloe
- Pseudomeloe

=== Subfamily Nemognathinae ===
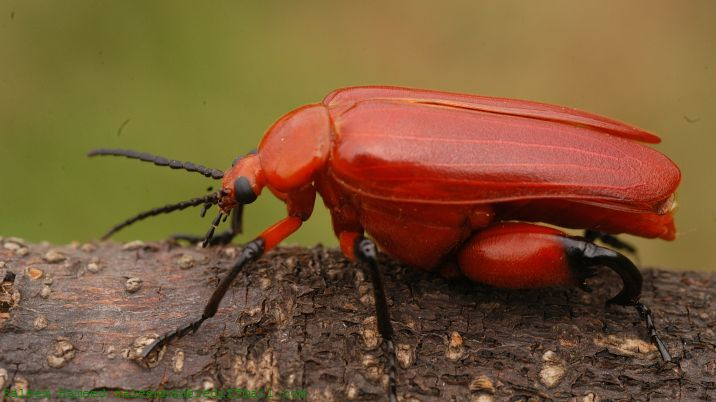
Horia sp. from Bannerghatta (Bangalore)

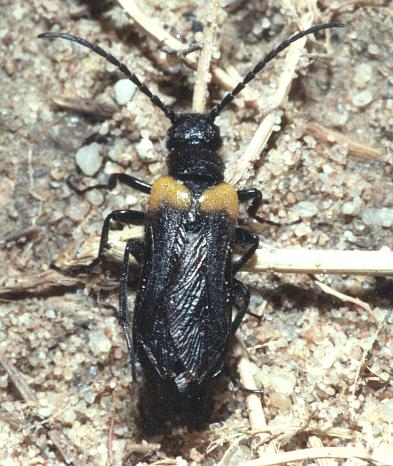
Sitaris muralis (Nemognathinae: Sitarini)

Tribe Horiini

- Cissites
- Horia
- Synhoria

Tribe Nemognathini

- Cochliophorus
- Euzonitis
- Gnathium
- Gnathonemula
- Leptopalpus
- Megatrachelus
- Nemognatha
- Palaestra
- Palaestrida
- Pseudozonitis
- Rhyphonemognatha
- Stenodera
- Zonitis
- Zonitodema
- Zonitolytta
- Zonitomorpha
- Zonitoschema

Tribe Sitarini

- Allendeselazaria
- Apalus
- Ctenopus
- Glasunovia
- Nyadatus
- Sitaris
- Sitarobrachys
- Stenoria

Genera incertae sedis

- Hornia
- Onyctenus
- Sitaromorpha
- Tricrania

=== Subfamily Tetraonycinae ===
Tribe Tetraonycini

- Meloetyphlus
- Opiomeloe
- Tetraonyx

== See also ==
- Blister beetle dermatitis
- Cantarella
