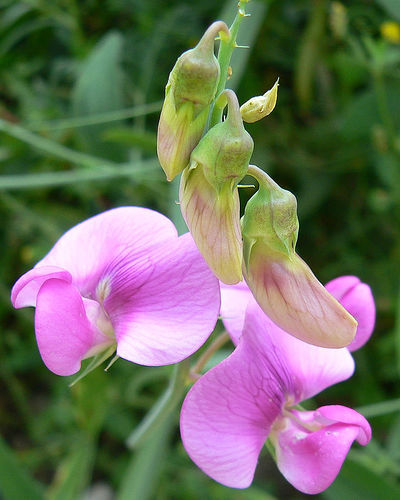

Scientific classification
- Kingdom: Plantae
- Clade: Tracheophytes
- Clade: Angiosperms
- Clade: Eudicots
- Clade: Rosids
- Order: Fabales
- Family: Fabaceae
- Subfamily: Faboideae
- Genus: Lathyrus
- Species: L. latifolius

Binomial name
- Lathyrus latifolius L.

Subspecies
- Lathyrus latifolius subsp. algericus (Ginzb.) Dobignard; Lathyrus latifolius subsp. latifolius

Synonyms
- List: Lathyrus sylvestris var. latifolius (L.) Fiori (1925); Lathyrus sylvestris subsp. latifolius (L.) Arcang. (1882); Pisum latifolium (L.) E.H.L.Krause (1901)

= Lathyrus latifolius =

Species of plant in the pea family

Lathyrus latifolius, the perennial peavine, perennial pea, broad-leaved everlasting-pea, or just everlasting pea, is a robust, sprawling herbaceous perennial flowering plant in the pea family Fabaceae. It is native to Europe but is present on other continents, such as North America and Australia, where it is most often seen along roadsides.

== Morphology ==
Lathyrus latifolius has winged hairless stems, and alternating blue green compound leaves consisting of a single pair of leaflets and a winged petiole about 2 inches (51 mm) long. The leaflets are narrowly ovate or oblong-ovate, smooth along the margins, hairless and up to 3 in (76 mm) long and 1 in (25 mm) across. There is a branched tendril between the leaflets.

=== Racemes ===
Short racemes of 4–11 flowers are produced from the axils of the leaves. The flowers, which are unscented, are about 3/4–1 in (19–25 mm) across with a typical structure for Faboideae, with an upper standard and lower keel, enclosed by lateral petals. There are 5 petals, which are purplish pink, fading with age. There is a green calyx with 5 teeth, often unequal. The blooming period lasts about 2 months during the summer and early autumn.

=== Seeds ===
The flowers are followed by hairless flattened seedpods, about 2 in (51 mm) long and 1/2 in (13 mm) wide, with several seeds inside. The seedpod, which is initially green, gradually turns brown, splitting open into curled segments, flinging out the seeds. The seeds are dark and oblong to reniform in shape.

== Reproduction ==
Lathyrus latifolius can reproduce vegetatively from its taproot and rhizomes, or from seed.

== Cultivation and habits ==
Lathyrus latifolius is a perennial herbaceous vine (climber), which can reach 6 feet or more by means of twining tendrils, but in open areas sprawls. It is frost-hardy, long-lived, and slowly spreading. The foliage becomes rather ragged and yellowish by the end of summer.

It requires partial to full sun, and loam or clay-loam soil that is moist, mesic, or slightly dry. Unlike the related annual sweet pea, Lathyrus odoratus, with which it may be confused, it has no scent. While grown as a garden plant it may be pervasive and difficult to remove. Because of this, this species is often considered to be a weed despite its attractive appearance.

Numerous cultivars have been selected as garden subjects, of which the following have gained the Royal Horticultural Society's Award of Garden Merit:

- L. latifolius (pink)
- 'Albus' (white)
- 'Rosa Perle' (pale pink)
- 'White Pearl' (white)

== Relations to insect life ==
Bumblebees pollinate the flowers and butterflies will visit the flowers for their nectar. Epicauta fabricii (Fabricius blister beetle), the caterpillars of Apantesis phyllira (Oithona tiger moth) and some herbivores feed on the leaves. However, the seeds are poisonous.
