= Epicauta alphonsii =

Scientific classification
- Kingdom: Animalia
- Phylum: Arthropoda
- Clade: Pancrustacea
- Class: Insecta
- Order: Coleoptera
- Suborder: Polyphaga
- Infraorder: Cucujiformia
- Family: Meloidae
- Tribe: Epicautini
- Genus: Epicauta
- Species: E. alphonsii

Binomial name
- Epicauta alphonsii Horn, 1874

Species of beetle

Epicauta alphonsii is a species of blister beetle in the family Meloidae.

== Distribution ==
It is found in North America.
