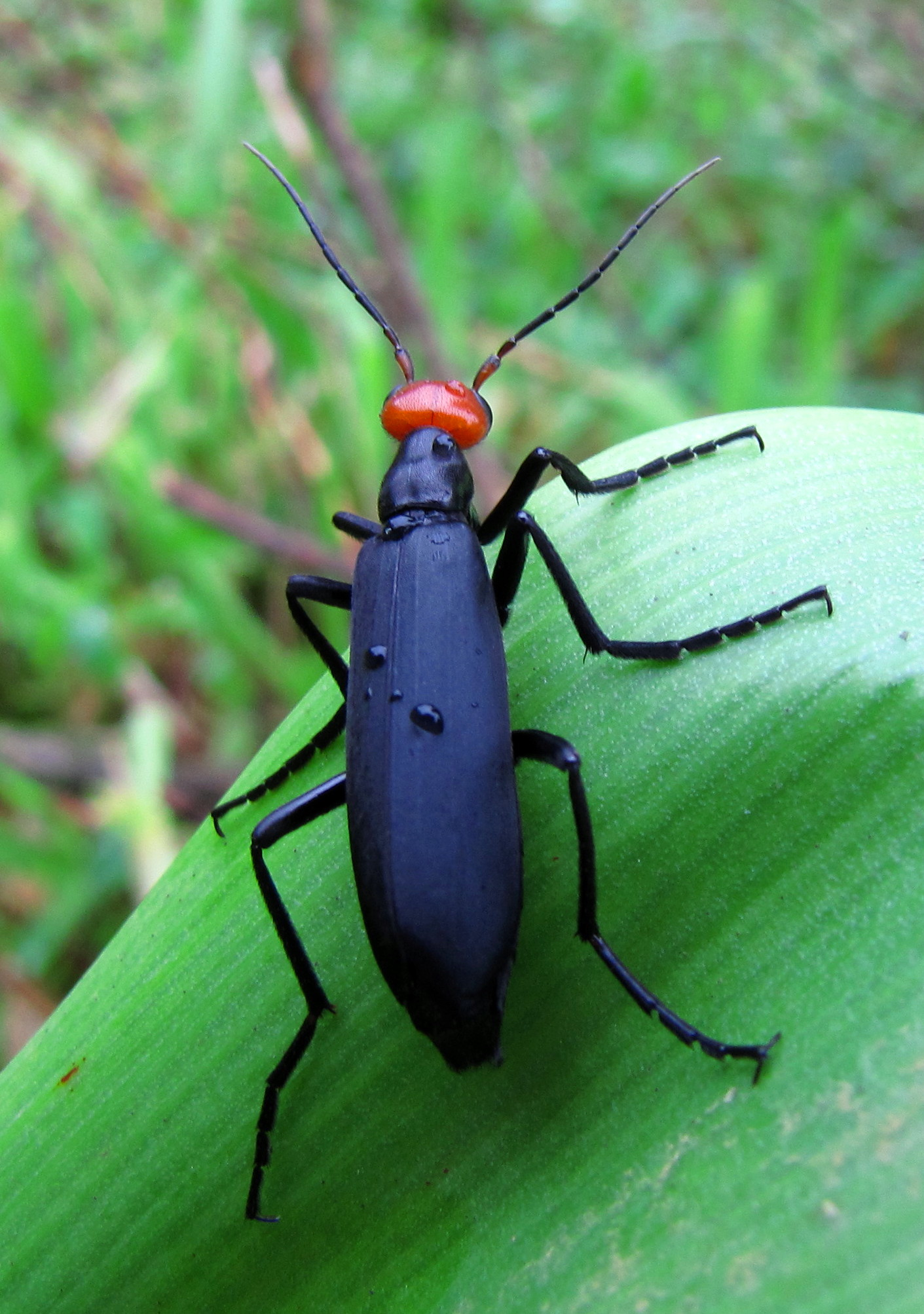
- Epicauta hirticornis

Scientific classification
- Kingdom: Animalia
- Phylum: Arthropoda
- Clade: Pancrustacea
- Class: Insecta
- Order: Coleoptera
- Suborder: Polyphaga
- Infraorder: Cucujiformia
- Family: Meloidae
- Subfamily: Meloinae
- Tribe: Epicautini; J.B. Parker & Böving, 1924
- Genus: Epicauta; Dejean, 1834

Species
- about 360

= Epicauta =

Genus of beetles

Epicauta is a genus of beetles in the blister beetle family, Meloidae. The genus was first scientifically described in 1834 by Pierre François Marie Auguste Dejean. Epicauta is distributed nearly worldwide, with species native to all continents except Australia and Antarctica. Surveys have found the genus to be particularly diverse in northern Arizona in the United States. Few species occur in the Arctic, with none farther north than the southern edge of the Northwest Territories, Canada.

Adult beetles feed on plants. The larvae are predators on the eggs of grasshoppers. The beetles can significantly damage plants, and many Epicauta are known as agricultural pests around the world, even known to cause crop failures at times. As do other blister beetles, these produce cantharidin, a toxic terpenoid which can kill animals such as horses if they ingest enough of the beetles.

This is one of the largest blister beetle genera, with about 360 described species as of 2011.

== Species ==
- Epicauta abadona Skinner, 1904
- Epicauta abeona Pinto, 1980
- Epicauta adspersa (Klug, 1825)
- Epicauta aemula (Fischer, 1827)
- Epicauta aethiops (Latreille, 1827)
- Epicauta afoveata Werner, 1949
- Epicauta alastor Skinner, 1904
- Epicauta albida (Say, 1824)
- Epicauta albolineata (Dugès, 1877)
- Epicauta albomarginata Mäklin, 1875
- Epicauta albovittata Gestro, 1878
- Epicauta alphonsii Horn, 1874
- Epicauta alpina Werner, 1944
- Epicauta ambusta (Pallas, 1781)
- Epicauta andersoni Werner, 1944
- Epicauta annulicornis Chevrolat, 1877
- Epicauta anthracina (Erichson, 1848)
- Epicauta apache Pinto, 1980
- Epicauta apicalis Dugès, 1889
- Epicauta apicipennis Tan, 1958
- Epicauta aptera Kaszab, 1952
- Epicauta apure Adams & Selander, 1979
- Epicauta aragua Adams & Selander, 1979
- Epicauta ardosia Fairmaire, 1896
- Epicauta arizonica Werner, 1944
- Epicauta aspera Werner, 1944
- Epicauta assamensis (Waterhouse, 1871)
- Epicauta assimilis (Haag-Rutenberg, 1880)
- Epicauta aterrima (Klug, 1825)
- Epicauta atkinsoni Kraatz, 1880
- Epicauta atomaria (Germar, 1821)
- Epicauta atrata (Fabricius, 1775)
- Epicauta atricolor Champion, 1892
- Epicauta atripilis Champion, 1892
- Epicauta atrivittata (LeConte, 1854)
- Epicauta atropos Pinto, 1991
- Epicauta audouini (Haag-Rutenberg, 1880)
- Epicauta auricomans Champion, 1892
- Epicauta badeni (Haag-Rutenberg, 1880)
- Epicauta balli Werner, 1945
- Epicauta basimacula (Haag-Rutenberg, 1880)
- Epicauta batesii Horn, 1875
- Epicauta beccarii (Haag-Rutenberg, 1880)
- Epicauta beckeri (Dugès, 1889)
- Epicauta bella Mäklin, 1875
- Epicauta bifovieceps Fairmaire, 1897
- Epicauta bimaculatithorax Pic, 1913
- Epicauta bisignata Mäklin, 1875
- Epicauta bispinosa Werner, 1949
- Epicauta bohemani Mäklin, 1875
- Epicauta borgmeieri Denier, 1935
- Epicauta borrei Dugès, 1881
- Epicauta bosqi Denier, 1935
- Epicauta brasilera Selander, 1981
- Epicauta brevipennis (Haag-Rutenberg, 1880)
- Epicauta brevitibialis Kaszab, 1952
- Epicauta bruchi Borchmann, 1930
- Epicauta brunnea Werner, 1944
- Epicauta brunneipennis (Haag-Rutenberg, 1880)
- Epicauta callosa LeConte, 1866
- Epicauta candidata Champion, 1892
- Epicauta canescens (Klug, 1835)
- Epicauta cardui (Dugès, 1869)
- Epicauta carmelita (Haag-Rutenberg, 1880)
- Epicauta castadiva Pinto, 1991
- Epicauta cavernosa Courbon, 1855
- Epicauta caviceps Horn, 1873
- Epicauta cazieri Dillon, 1952
- Epicauta centenaria Breyer y Trant, 1910
- Epicauta centralis Burmeister, 1881
- Epicauta cervina Mäklin, 1875
- Epicauta chalybea (Erichson, 1843)
- Epicauta cheni Tan, 1958
- Epicauta chinensis (Laporte, 1840)
- Epicauta cicatrix Werner, 1951
- Epicauta cinctipennis (Chevrolat, 1834)
- Epicauta cinerea Forster, 1771
- Epicauta cinereiventris Champion, 1892
- Epicauta clericalis (Berg, 1881)
- Epicauta cognata (Haag-Rutenberg, 1880)
- Epicauta compressicollis Champion, 1892
- Epicauta conferta (Say, 1824)
- Epicauta coromandelensis (Haag-Rutenberg, 1880)
- Epicauta corvina (LeConte, 1858)
- Epicauta corybantica Pinto, 1991
- Epicauta costata (LeConte, 1854)
- Epicauta costipennis Borchmann, 1930
- Epicauta courboni (Guérin-Ménéville, 1855)
- Epicauta crassitarsis Maydell, 1935
- Epicauta cribricollis Fairmaire, 1893
- Epicauta croceicincta Dugès, 1881
- Epicauta crucera Selander, 1981
- Epicauta cryptogramaca Yang & Ren, 2006
- Epicauta cupraeola (Dugès, 1869)
- Epicauta curticollis Borchmann, 1930
- Epicauta curvicornis (Haag-Rutenberg, 1880)
- Epicauta curvispina Kaszab, 1952
- Epicauta cyclops Fairmaire, 1891
- Epicauta dalihodi Dvorák, 1996
- Epicauta delicata Mathieu, 1983
- Epicauta desgodinsi Frivaldszky, 1892
- Epicauta diana Pinto, 1991
- Epicauta discolor (Haag-Rutenberg, 1880)
- Epicauta disparilis (Champion, 1892)
- Epicauta distorta (Champion, 1892)
- Epicauta diversicornis Haag-Rutenberg, 1880
- Epicauta diversipubescens Maydell, 1934
- Epicauta divisa (Haag-Rutenberg, 1880)
- Epicauta dohrni (Haag-Rutenberg, 1880)
- Epicauta dongolensis (Laporte de Castelnau in Brullé, 1840)
- Epicauta dubia (Fabricius, 1781)
- Epicauta dusaunlti (Dufour, 1821)
- Epicauta elegantula Péringuey, 1909
- Epicauta emarginata Champion, 1892
- Epicauta emmerichi Pic, 1934
- Epicauta ennsi Werner, 1957
- Epicauta enona Péringuey, 1899
- Epicauta ensiformis Werner, 1944
- Epicauta erythraea Pic, 1911
- Epicauta erythrocephala Pallas, 1776 - type species
- Epicauta evanescens Champion, 1892
- Epicauta excavata (Klug, 1825)
- Epicauta excavatifrons Maydell, 1934
- Epicauta excors (Fall, 1909)
- Epicauta fabricii (LeConte, 1853)
- Epicauta fallax Horn, 1885
- Epicauta fasciceps Walker, 1871
- Epicauta femoralis (Erichson, 1834)
- Epicauta ferruginea Say, 1824
- Epicauta fissilabris (LeConte in Agassiz, 1850)
- Epicauta flabellicornis (Germar, 1817)
- Epicauta flagellaria (Erichson, 1848)
- Epicauta flavocinerea (Blatchley, 1910)
- Epicauta flavogrisea (Haag-Rutenberg, 1880)
- Epicauta flobcina Pinto, 1991
- Epicauta floridensis Werner, 1944
- Epicauta floydwerneri Martínez, 1955
- Epicauta forticornis Haag-Rutenberg, 1880
- Epicauta fortis Werner, 1944
- Epicauta franciscana Denier, 1935
- Epicauta fuliginosa (Olivier, 1795)
- Epicauta fulviceps Mäklin, 1875
- Epicauta fulvipes (Klug, 1825)
- Epicauta fumosa (Germar, 1824)
- Epicauta fumosa Haag-Rutenberg, 1880
- Epicauta funebris Horn, 1873
- Epicauta funesta (Chevrolat, 1834)
- Epicauta gissleri (Horn, 1878)
- Epicauta gorhami (Marseul, 1873)
- Epicauta grammica (Fischer, 1827)
- Epicauta grandiceps (Haag-Rutenberg, 1880)
- Epicauta griseonigra Fairmaire, 1873
- Epicauta griseovittata Haag-Rutenberg, 1880
- Epicauta haagi F. Bates, 1875
- Epicauta haematocephala (Haag-Rutenberg, 1880)
- Epicauta haroldi (Haag-Rutenberg, 1880)
- Epicauta heterodera Horn, 1891
- Epicauta hieroglyphica (Haag-Rutenberg, 1880)
- Epicauta himalayica Kaszab, 1960
- Epicauta hirsutipubescens (Maydell, 1934)
- Epicauta hirticornis (Haag-Rutenberg, 1880)
- Epicauta hirtipes (Waterhouse, 1871)
- Epicauta horaki Dvorák, 1996
- Epicauta horni Champion, 1892
- Epicauta hubbelli Werner, 1973
- Epicauta humeralis (Dugès, 1889)
- Epicauta hydrocephala Fairmaire, 1893
- Epicauta hypoleuca (Klug, 1825)
- Epicauta immaculata (Say, 1824)
- Epicauta impressicornis (Pic, 1913)
- Epicauta impressifrons Van Dyke, 1928
- Epicauta incompleta Fairmaire, 1896
- Epicauta inconstans Fischer de Waldheim, 1827
- Epicauta indiana Kaszab, 1956
- Epicauta ingrata Fall, 1907
- Epicauta insignis Horn, 1885
- Epicauta insularis (Haag-Rutenberg, 1880)
- Epicauta intermedia Haag-Rutenberg, 1880
- Epicauta interrupta (Fairmaire, 1889)
- Epicauta jeanneli Pic, 1913
- Epicauta jeffersi Pinto, 1980
- Epicauta jimenezi Dugès, 1889
- Epicauta jucunda Péringuey, 1888
- Epicauta kansana Werner, 1944
- Epicauta korytkowskii Kaszab, 1978
- Epicauta kraussi (Haag-Rutenberg, 1880)
- Epicauta kwangsiensis Tan, 1958
- Epicauta labialis (Dugès, 1881)
- Epicauta laevicollis Mäklin, 1875
- Epicauta laevicornis Werner, 1973
- Epicauta languida (Horn, 1895)
- Epicauta laticornis (Haag-Rutenberg, 1880)
- Epicauta latitarsis (Haag-Rutenberg, 1880)
- Epicauta lauta (Horn, 1885)
- Epicauta lemniscata (Fabricius, 1801)
- Epicauta leonensis Pic, 1913
- Epicauta leoni Dugès, 1889
- Epicauta leopardina (Haag-Rutenberg, 1880)
- Epicauta leucocoma Champion, 1892
- Epicauta levettei Casey, 1891
- Epicauta liebecki Werner, 1944
- Epicauta linearis (LeConte, 1858)
- Epicauta longicollis (LeConte, 1853)
- Epicauta luctifera (Fairmaire, 1873)
- Epicauta luteolineata Pic, 1933
- Epicauta maculata (Say, 1824)
- Epicauta maculifera (Maydell, 1934)
- Epicauta magnomaculata Martin, 1932
- Epicauta maklini (Haag-Rutenberg, 1880)
- Epicauta mandibularis Anand, 1977
- Epicauta mannerheimi (Mäklin, 1875)
- Epicauta manovana Pic, 1913
- Epicauta mashuna Péringuey, 1899
- Epicauta maura (LeConte, 1851)
- Epicauta megacephala (Champion, 1892)
- Epicauta megalocephala (Gebler, 1817)
- Epicauta melanocephala (Fabricius, 1801)
- Epicauta melanota (Mäklin, 1875)
- Epicauta merkeliana Horn, 1891
- Epicauta mesembryanthemi Péringuey, 1888
- Epicauta mima Péringuey, 1909
- Epicauta mimetica (Horn, 1875)
- Epicauta minutepunctata Borchmann, 1930
- Epicauta missionum (Berg, 1881)
- Epicauta modesta (Haag-Rutenberg, 1880)
- Epicauta moesta Péringuey, 1886
- Epicauta mojiangensis Tan Juanjie, 1993
- Epicauta monachica (Berg, 1883)
- Epicauta montana Anand, 1977
- Epicauta montara Ballmer, 1979
- Epicauta murina (LeConte, 1853)
- Epicauta nattereri (Haag-Rutenberg, 1880)
- Epicauta neglecta (Haag-Rutenberg, 1880)
- Epicauta nepalensis (Hope in Gray, 1831)
- Epicauta nigra Dugés, 1870
- Epicauta nigrans (Mäklin, 1875)
- Epicauta nigritarsis (LeConte, 1853)
- Epicauta nigromarginata (Mäklin, 1875)
- Epicauta nigropunctata (Blanchard, 1843)
- Epicauta niveolineata (Haag-Rutenberg, 1880)
- Epicauta normalis Werner, 1944
- Epicauta notaticollis Péringuey, 1888
- Epicauta nyassensis (Haag-Rutenberg, 1880)
- Epicauta obesa (Chevrolat, 1835)
- Epicauta oblita (LeConte, 1851)
- Epicauta obscureovittata Wellman, 1910
- Epicauta obscuricornis Chevrolet, 1877
- Epicauta obscurocephala Reitter, 1905
- Epicauta occidentalis Werner, 1944
- Epicauta ocellata Dugés, 1869
- Epicauta ochrea (LeConte, 1853)
- Epicauta oculata (Fabricius, 1792)
- Epicauta optata Péringuey, 1892
- Epicauta oregona Horn, 1875
- Epicauta ovampoa Péringuey, 1899
- Epicauta palpalis Kaszab, 1981
- Epicauta pardalis (LeConte, 1866)
- Epicauta parkeri Werner, 1944
- Epicauta parvula (Haldeman, 1854)
- Epicauta pedalis (LeConte, 1866)
- Epicauta pensylvanica (De Geer, 1775)
- Epicauta philaemata (Klug, 1825)
- Epicauta phoenix Werner, 1944
- Epicauta picitarsis Fairmaire, 1885
- Epicauta picta (Laporte, 1840)
- Epicauta pilma (Molina, 1782)
- Epicauta pilsbryi Skinner, 1906
- Epicauta platycera Fairmaire, 1876
- Epicauta pleuralis Fairmaire
- Epicauta pluvialis Borchmann, 1930
- Epicauta polingi Werner, 1944
- Epicauta politicollis Fairmaire, 1893
- Epicauta probsti Dvorák, 1996
- Epicauta prolifica Wellman, 1909
- Epicauta promerotricha Dvorák, 1996
- Epicauta proscripta Pinto, 1980
- Epicauta prosopidis Werner, 1973
- Epicauta pruinosa LeConte, 1866
- Epicauta punctata (Pallas, 1781)
- Epicauta puncticollis Mannerheim, 1843
- Epicauta punctipennis Werner, 1944
- Epicauta punctum Dugés, 1869
- Epicauta punjabensis Saha, 1979
- Epicauta purpurea (Horn, 1885)
- Epicauta purpureiceps (Berg, 1889)
- Epicauta quadraticollis Fairmaire, 1891
- Epicauta rehni Maydell, 1934
- Epicauta reini (Kiesenwetter, 1879)
- Epicauta rileyi Horn, 1874
- Epicauta rubriceps (Redtenbacher, 1842)
- Epicauta rubricollis (Reiche in Ferret & Galin, 1850)
- Epicauta ruficeps (Illiger in Wiedemeyer, 1800)
- Epicauta rufidorsum (Goeze, 1777)
- Epicauta rufifrons Fåhraeus, 1870
- Epicauta rufipedes Dugés, 1870
- Epicauta rufipennis (Chevrolet, 1834)
- Epicauta rufoscutellaris Pic, 1913
- Epicauta rugicollis (Fairmaire, 1887)
- Epicauta ruidosana Fall, 1907
- Epicauta rutilifrons Borchmann, 1930
- Epicauta sanctoruensis Zaragoza-Caballero & Velasco-de Leon, 2003
- Epicauta sanguiniceps (Fairmaire, 1885)
- Epicauta sanguinicollis (LeConte, 1853)
- Epicauta sanguinithorax Haag-Rutenberg, 1880
- Epicauta schneideri Dvorák, 1996
- Epicauta segmenta (Say, 1823)
- Epicauta seminitida Wellman, 1910
- Epicauta semitestacea Fairmaire, 1896
- Epicauta semivittata Fairmaire, 1875
- Epicauta senilis Werner, 1949
- Epicauta seriata Ren & Yang, 2007
- Epicauta sericans LeConte, 1866
- Epicauta sharpi Marseul, 1875
- Epicauta sibirica (Pallas, 1773)
- Epicauta singularis Champion, 1892
- Epicauta sparsicapilla Yang & Ren, 2007
- Epicauta spilotella Péringuey, 1904
- Epicauta spinicornis Pic, 1911
- Epicauta spurcaticollis Fairmaire, 1883
- Epicauta stigmata Dugès, 1869
- Epicauta straba Horn, 1891
- Epicauta strangulata (Gerstaecker, 1854)
- Epicauta strigata (Gyllenhal in Schoenherr, 1817)
- Epicauta strigida Marseul, 1879
- Epicauta strigosa (Gyllenhal in Schoenherr, 1817)
- Epicauta stuarti LeConte, 1868
- Epicauta subatra Dugés, 1889
- Epicauta subglabra (Fall, 1922)
- Epicauta sublineata (LeConte, 1854)
- Epicauta subrubra Dugés, 1886
- Epicauta subvittata (Erichson, 1848)
- Epicauta sulcicollis Mäklin, 1875
- Epicauta suturalis (Germar, 1821)
- Epicauta talpa Haag-Rutenberg, 1880
- Epicauta tamara Adams & Selander, 1979
- Epicauta tarasca Pinto, 1991
- Epicauta temexa Adams & Selander, 1979
- Epicauta tenebrosa Werner, 1949
- Epicauta tenella (LeConte, 1858)
- Epicauta tenuicollis (Pallas, 1782)
- Epicauta tenuicornis (Champion, 1892)
- Epicauta tenuilineata (Horn, 1894)
- Epicauta tenuis (LeConte, 1853)
- Epicauta teresa Mathieu, 1983
- Epicauta terminata Dugés, 1869
- Epicauta testaceipes Fairmaire in Révoil, 1882
- Epicauta tetragramma Haag-Rutenberg, 1880
- Epicauta texana Werner, 1944
- Epicauta textilis (Haag-Rutenberg, 1880)
- Epicauta thailandica Dvorák, 1996
- Epicauta thoracica (Erichson, 1843)
- Epicauta tibialis (Waterhouse, 1871)
- Epicauta tomentosa Mäklin, 1875
- Epicauta torsa (LeConte, 1853)
- Epicauta trichrus (Pallas, 1798)
- Epicauta tricostata (Werner, 1943)
- Epicauta tripartita Champion, 1892
- Epicauta tristis (Mäklin, 1875)
- Epicauta unicalcarata Champion, 1892
- Epicauta uniforma Werner, 1944
- Epicauta unilineata Champion, 1891
- Epicauta valida (LeConte, 1853)
- Epicauta velata (Gerstaecker, 1854)
- Epicauta ventralis Werner, 1945
- Epicauta vicina Haag-Rutenberg, 1880
- Epicauta vidua (Klug, 1825)
- Epicauta villipes Haag-Rutenberg, 1880
- Epicauta virgulata (LeConte, 1866)
- Epicauta viridipennis Burmeister, 1865
- Epicauta vittata (Fabricius, 1775)
- Epicauta vitticollis (Haag-Rutenberg, 1880)
- Epicauta vittulata Borehmann, 1917
- Epicauta waterhousei (Haag-Rutenberg, 1880)
- Epicauta weixiensis Tan, 1992
- Epicauta wellmani Kaszab, 1956
- Epicauta westermanni Mäklin, 1875
- Epicauta weyrauchii Kaszab, 1960
- Epicauta wheeleri Horn, 1873
- Epicauta willei Denier, 1940
- Epicauta wittmeri Kaszab, 1978
- Epicauta xanthocephala (Klug, 1825)
- Epicauta xanthomeros (Fischer, 1827)
- Epicauta xantusi Kaszab, 1952
- Epicauta yungana Denier, 1935
- Epicauta zebra (Dohrn, 1876)
- Epicauta zischakai Martínez, 1955
