= Epicauta torsa =

Scientific classification
- Kingdom: Animalia
- Phylum: Arthropoda
- Clade: Pancrustacea
- Class: Insecta
- Order: Coleoptera
- Suborder: Polyphaga
- Infraorder: Cucujiformia
- Family: Meloidae
- Genus: Epicauta
- Species: E. torsa

Binomial name
- Epicauta torsa (LeConte, 1853)

Species of beetle

Epicauta torsa is a species of blister beetle in the family Meloidae. It is found in North America.
