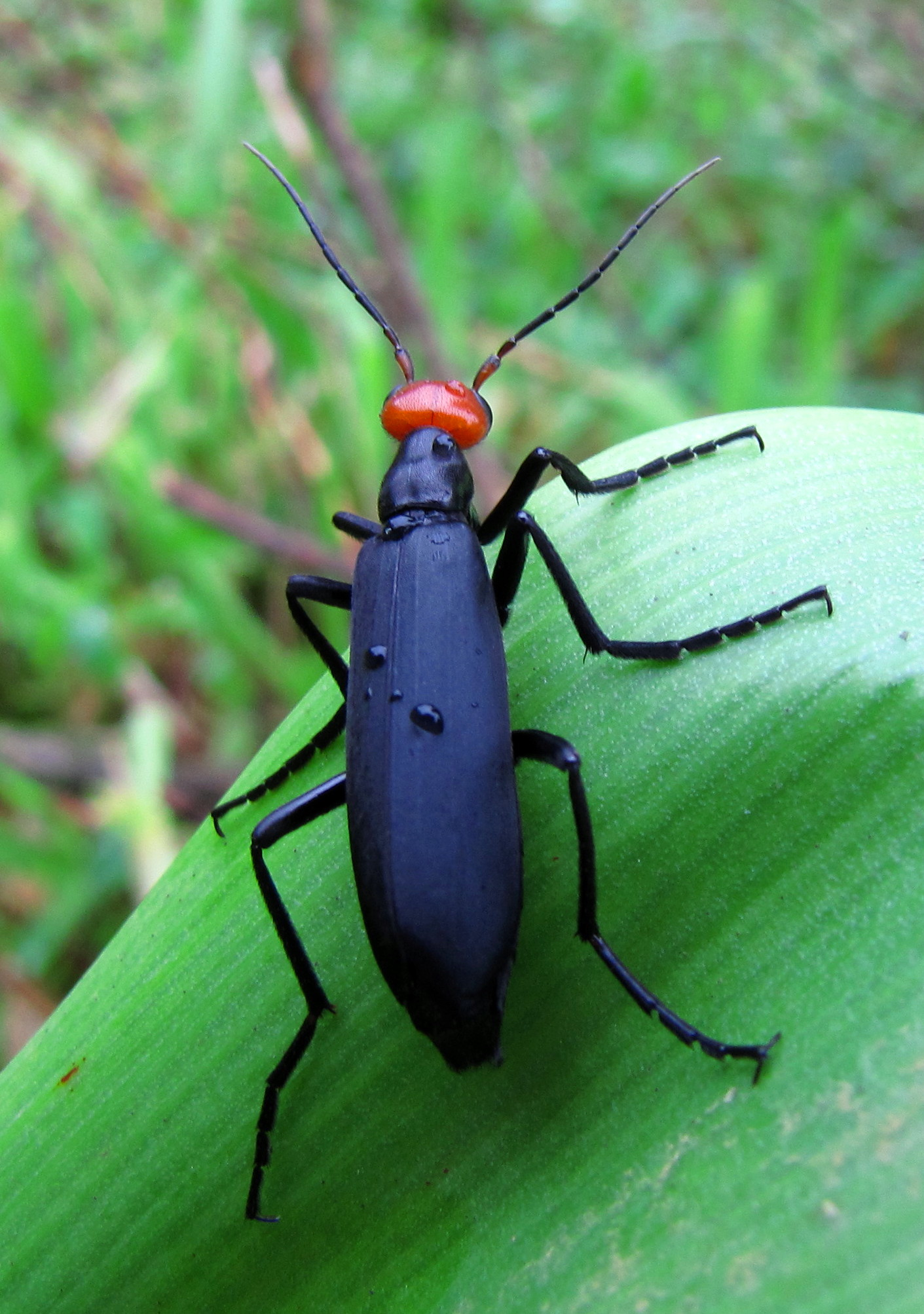

Scientific classification
- Kingdom: Animalia
- Phylum: Arthropoda
- Clade: Pancrustacea
- Class: Insecta
- Order: Coleoptera
- Suborder: Polyphaga
- Infraorder: Cucujiformia
- Family: Meloidae
- Genus: Epicauta
- Species: E. hirticornis

Binomial name
- Epicauta hirticornis Haag-Rutenberg,1880

= Epicauta hirticornis =

Species of beetle

Epicauta hirticornis is a beetle species from the family of oil beetles (Meloidae). The species was first scientifically described in 1880 by Haag-Rutenberg.

== Description ==
Epicauta hirticornis beetles have slender bodies with black elytra, red heads, and black-and-white striped abdomens. Their heads are distinctly separated from the prothorax, and the tip of their abdomens are visible beyond the tip of their elytra. They are gregarious and typically found in groups.

== Mating and reproduction ==
Before mating, pairs of Epicauta hirticornis display unique courtship behavior. When the male mounts a female, he will entwine either his left or right antenna with the female's own, forming a double-helix shape. Once entwined, the antennae then vibrate, typically for between 30-60 seconds. Females occasionally avoid mating by pressing their antennae against the surfaces of their host plant or by otherwise hiding their antennae.

Gravid females lay their elongated yellow eggs in clusters of 100–200 in holes they make in the soil. Once the larvae hatch, they burrow through the soil until they find a grasshopper egg mass to feed upon. Over the next 3-4 weeks, the larvae will molt four times, and develop through a series of highly morphologically distinct instars.

== Interactions with humans ==
Like other species of burning blister beetles, Epicauta hirticornis produces a compound known as cantharidin. As a powerful vesicant, cantharidin produces intense irritation of the skin and when ingested, can irritate the mucus membranes of the gastrointestinal tract and the urinary bladder and urethra. Signs of cantharidin poisoning in humans include vomiting, vomiting blood, abdominal pain, weakness, burning sensation in the mouth and pharynx, bloody urine, low urine volume, and mucosal erosion and hemorrhage in the upper gastrointestinal tract.

The cantharidin produced by Epicauta hirticornis has traditionally been used in the folk medicine practices of various regions, including as an anti-tumor agent by the Karbi people of India and as an aphrodisiac in traditional Chinese medicine. Research suggests that cantharidin may help to inhibit the energy and anabolic supply to cancer cells.
