= Epicauta haematocephala =

Scientific classification
- Kingdom: Animalia
- Phylum: Arthropoda
- Clade: Pancrustacea
- Class: Insecta
- Order: Coleoptera
- Suborder: Polyphaga
- Infraorder: Cucujiformia
- Family: Meloidae
- Genus: Epicauta
- Species: E. haematocephala

Binomial name
- Epicauta haematocephala (Haag-Rutenberg, 1880)

Synonyms
- Lytta haematocephala Haag-Rutenberg, 1880; Epicauta haematocephala Borchmann, 1917

Species of beetle

Epicauta haematocephala is a species of blister beetle found in Sri Lanka.
