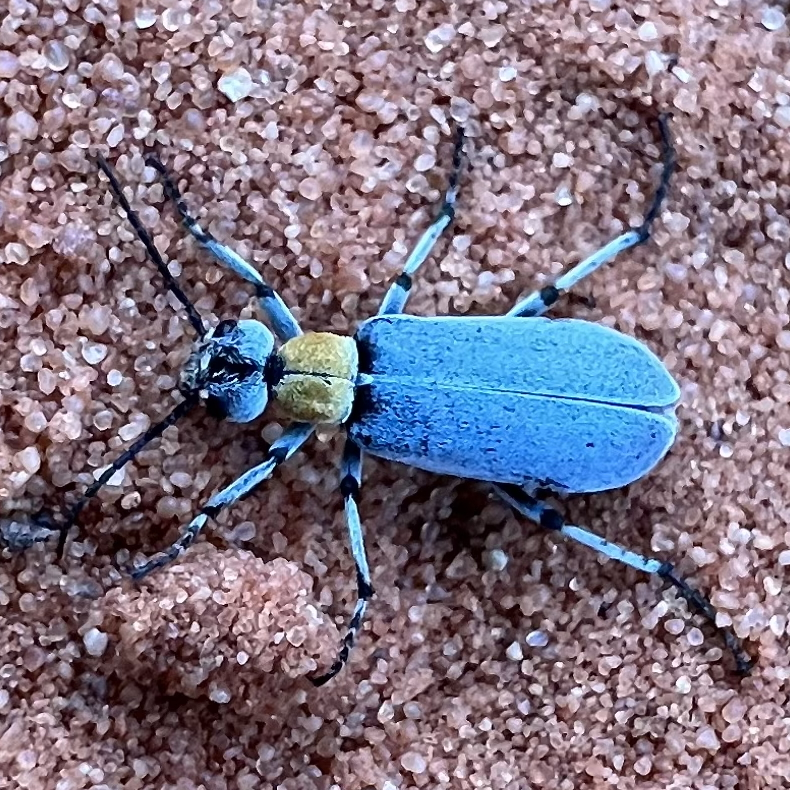

Scientific classification
- Kingdom: Animalia
- Phylum: Arthropoda
- Clade: Pancrustacea
- Class: Insecta
- Order: Coleoptera
- Suborder: Polyphaga
- Infraorder: Cucujiformia
- Family: Meloidae
- Tribe: Epicautini
- Genus: Epicauta
- Species: E. wheeleri

Binomial name
- Epicauta wheeleri Horn, 1873

= Epicauta wheeleri =

Species of beetle

Epicauta wheeleri is a species of blister beetle in the family Meloidae. It is referred to colloquially by the common name "ethereal beef weevil" in areas of southern Utah and Nevada, as well as other parts of the southwest. This name refers to the beetle's stunning iridescence in the harsh desert sunlight, and it's very pronounced body segments (similar to those typical of a weevil), along with the fact that it is often found in and around cattle pastures by beef ranchers and farmers. However, it is not a true weevil, and is actually a blister beetle. It is found in North America.
