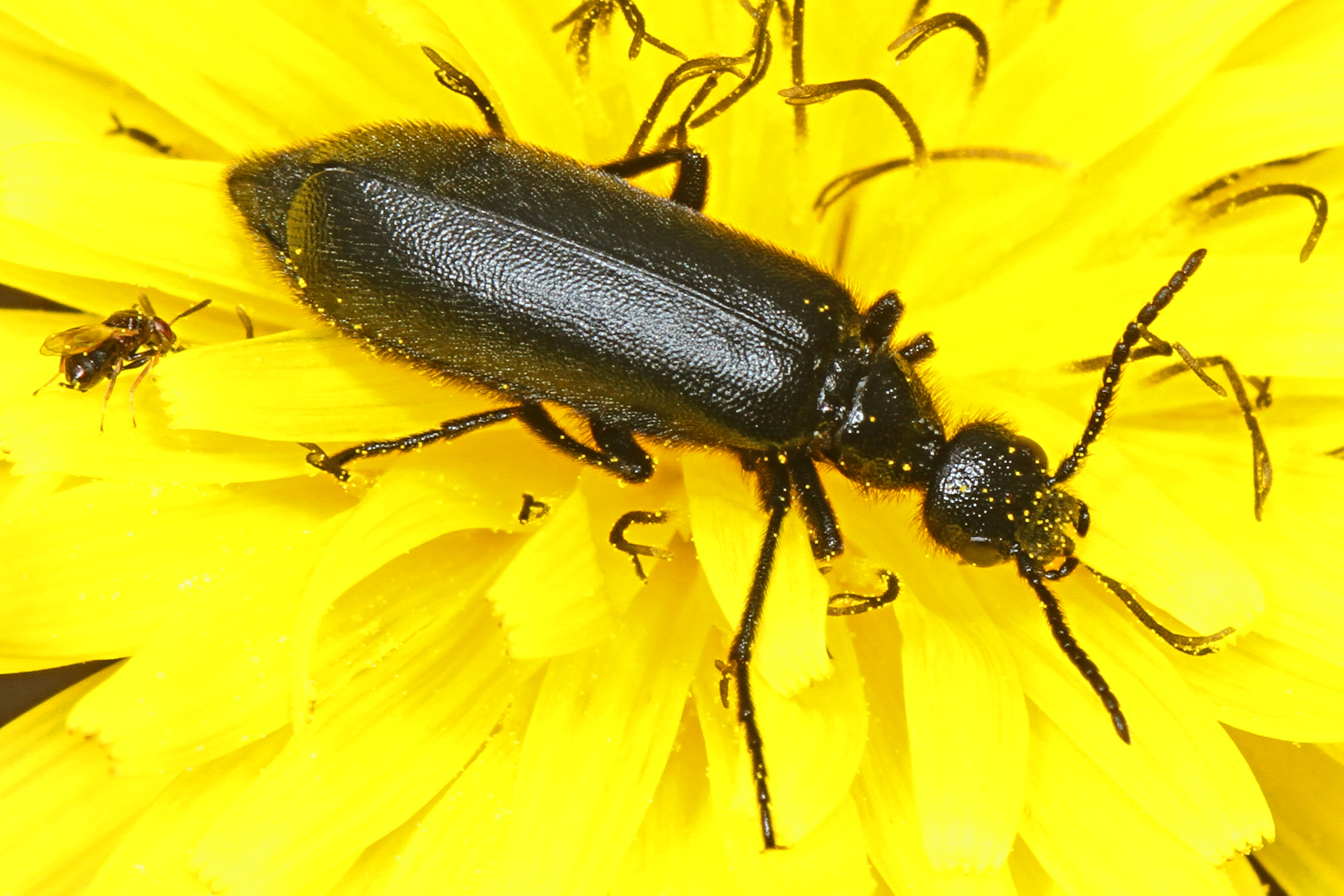

Scientific classification
- Kingdom: Animalia
- Phylum: Arthropoda
- Clade: Pancrustacea
- Class: Insecta
- Order: Coleoptera
- Suborder: Polyphaga
- Infraorder: Cucujiformia
- Family: Meloidae
- Tribe: Epicautini
- Genus: Epicauta
- Species: E. puncticollis

Binomial name
- Epicauta puncticollis Mannerheim, 1843

= Epicauta puncticollis =

Species of beetle

Epicauta puncticollis, the punctate blister beetle, is a species of blister beetle in the family Meloidae. It is found in Central America and North America.
