= Epicauta abadona =

Scientific classification
- Kingdom: Animalia
- Phylum: Arthropoda
- Clade: Pancrustacea
- Class: Insecta
- Order: Coleoptera
- Suborder: Polyphaga
- Infraorder: Cucujiformia
- Family: Meloidae
- Tribe: Epicautini
- Genus: Epicauta
- Species: E. abadona

Binomial name
- Epicauta abadona Skinner, 1904

Species of beetle

Epicauta abadona is a species of blister beetle in the family Meloidae. It is found in Central America and North America.
