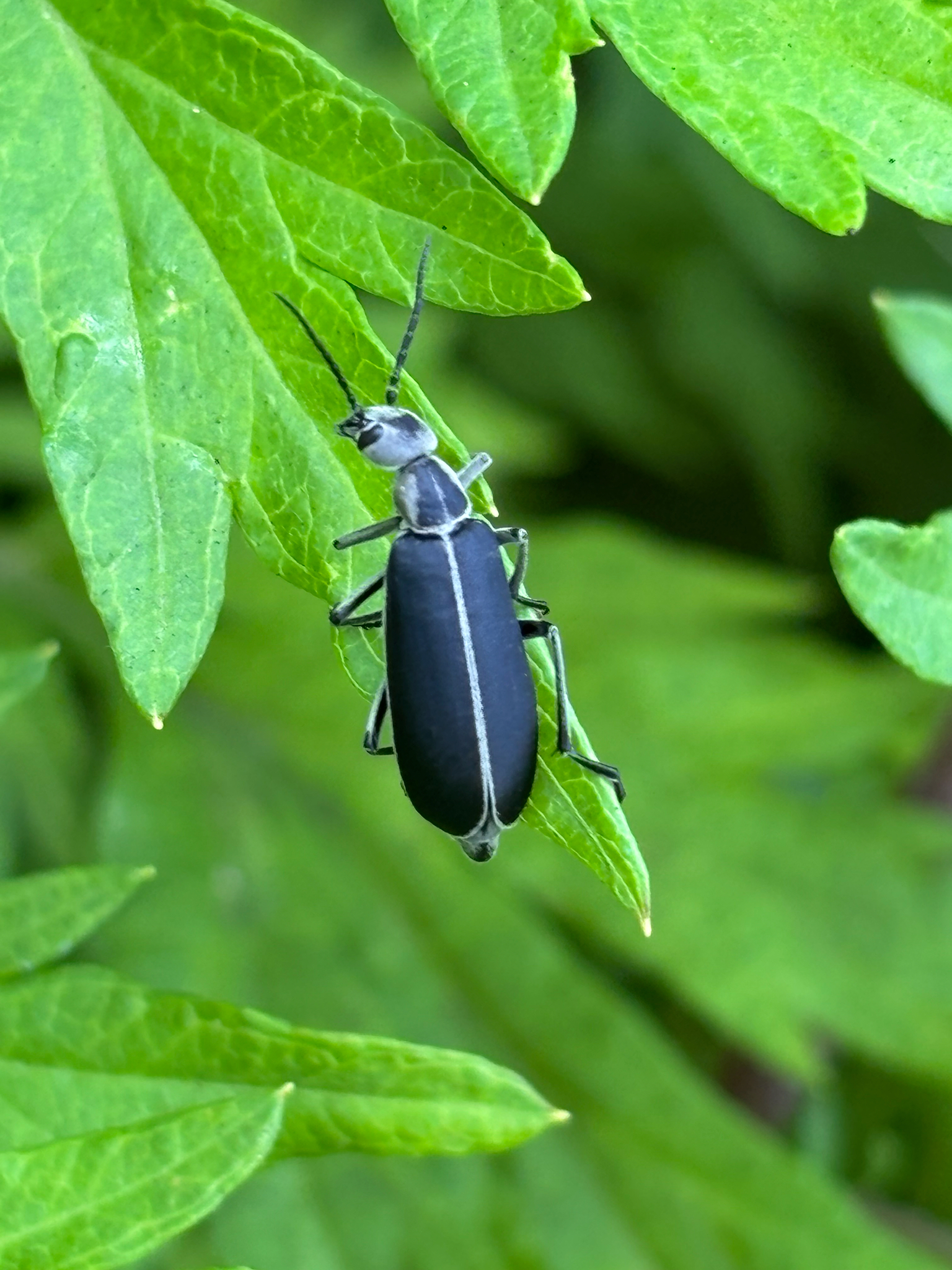

Scientific classification
- Kingdom: Animalia
- Phylum: Arthropoda
- Clade: Pancrustacea
- Class: Insecta
- Order: Coleoptera
- Suborder: Polyphaga
- Infraorder: Cucujiformia
- Family: Meloidae
- Tribe: Epicautini
- Genus: Epicauta
- Species: E. cinerea

Binomial name
- Epicauta cinerea (Forster, 1771)

Synonyms
- Epicauta marginata (Fabricius, 1775)

= Epicauta cinerea =

Species of beetle

Epicauta cinerea, the clematis blister beetle, is a species of blister beetle in the family Meloidae. It is found in North America.
