= Epicauta aspera =

Scientific classification
- Kingdom: Animalia
- Phylum: Arthropoda
- Clade: Pancrustacea
- Class: Insecta
- Order: Coleoptera
- Suborder: Polyphaga
- Infraorder: Cucujiformia
- Family: Meloidae
- Tribe: Epicautini
- Genus: Epicauta
- Species: E. aspera

Binomial name
- Epicauta aspera Werner, 1944

Species of beetle

Epicauta aspera is a species of blister beetle in the family Meloidae. It is found in North America.
