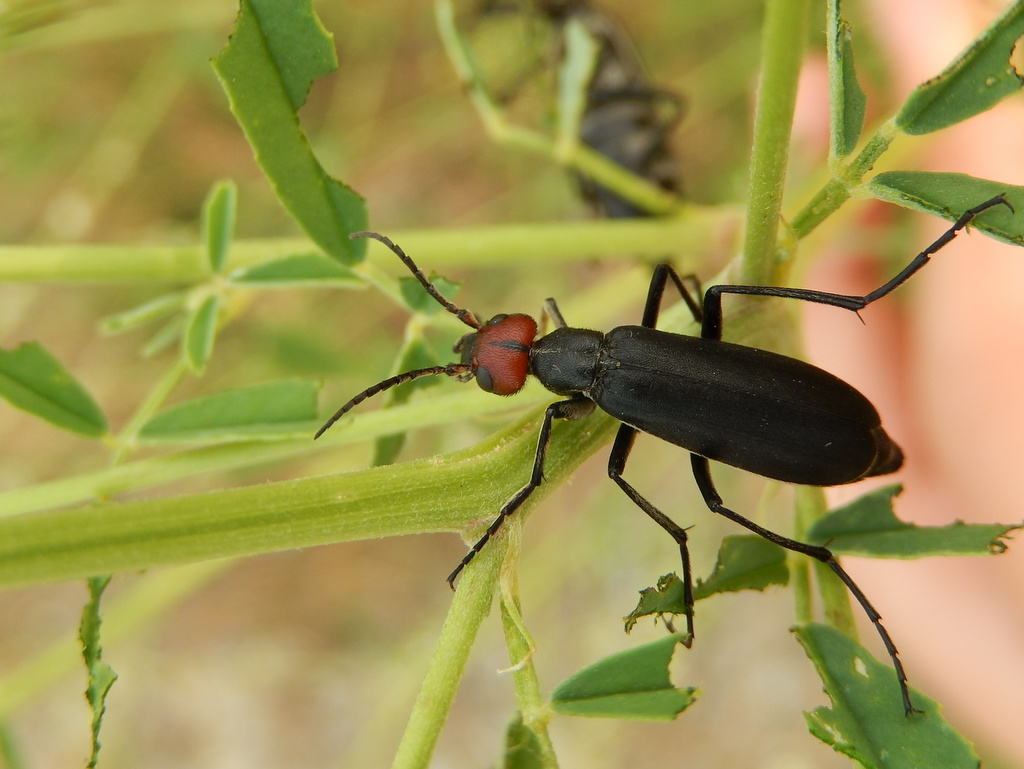
- Adult on Melilotus albus

Scientific classification
- Kingdom: Animalia
- Phylum: Arthropoda
- Clade: Pancrustacea
- Class: Insecta
- Order: Coleoptera
- Suborder: Polyphaga
- Infraorder: Cucujiformia
- Family: Meloidae
- Genus: Epicauta
- Species: E. rufidorsum

Binomial name
- Epicauta rufidorsum Goeze, 1777

= Epicauta rufidorsum =

Species of beetle

Epicauta rufidorsum is a species of beetle of the family Meloidae.

Adults feed on leaves and flowers of various herbaceous plants, whereas larvae feed on Acrididae eggs.
