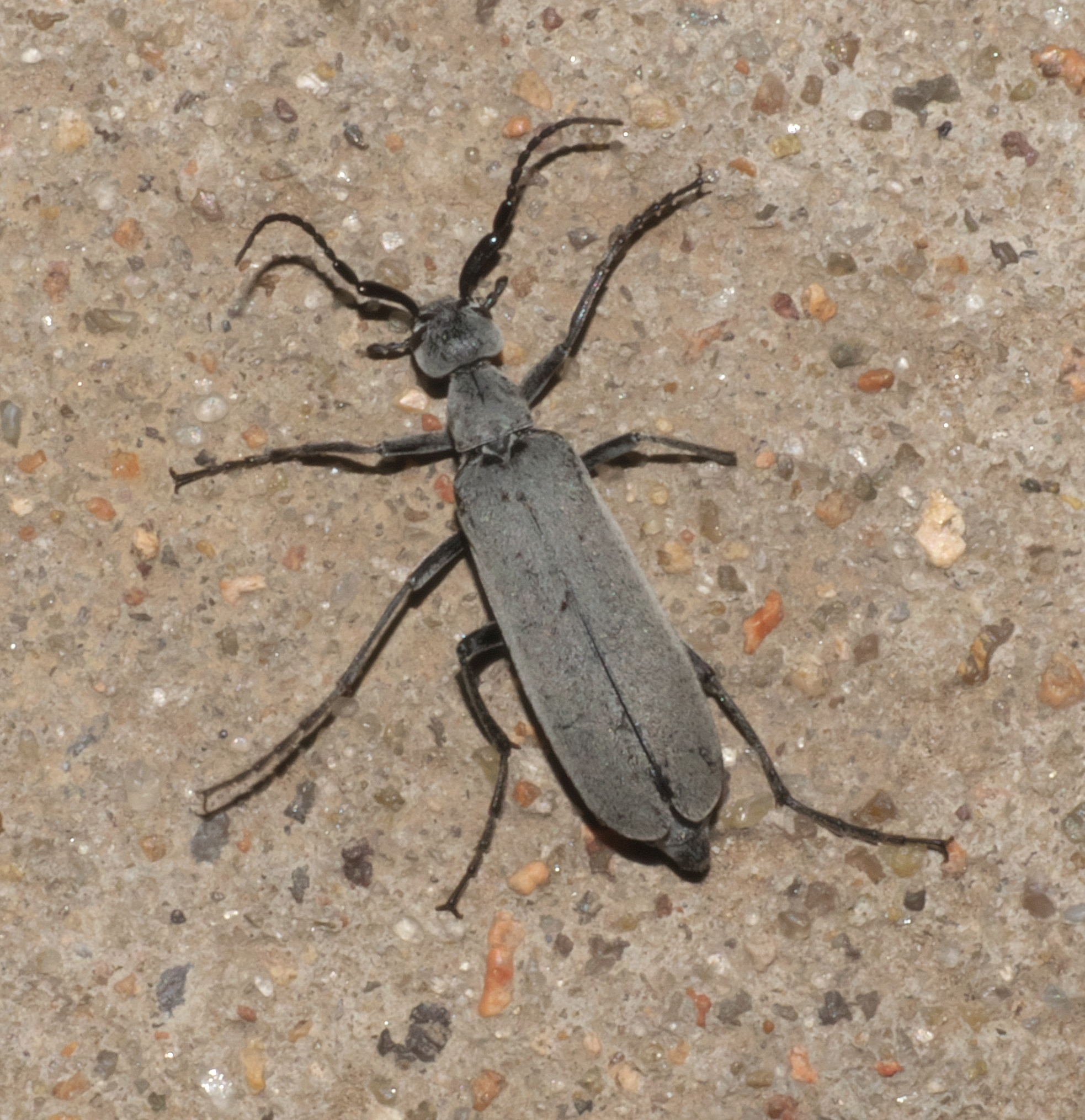
- Epicauta fabricii, ashgray blister beetle, Texas

Scientific classification
- Kingdom: Animalia
- Phylum: Arthropoda
- Clade: Pancrustacea
- Class: Insecta
- Order: Coleoptera
- Suborder: Polyphaga
- Infraorder: Cucujiformia
- Family: Meloidae
- Subfamily: Meloinae
- Tribe: Epicautini
- Genus: Epicauta
- Species: E. fabricii

Binomial name
- Epicauta fabricii (LeConte, 1853)

= Epicauta fabricii =

Species of beetle

Epicauta fabricii, the ashgray blister beetle, is a species of blister beetle in the family Meloidae. It is found in North America. The adults feed on the foliage of honeylocusts, black locusts, and legumes like alfalfa, and the larvae feed on grasshopper eggs. Adults have been directly observed feeding on sweet clover, wild indigo, soybean, and locoweed. as well as okra, green bell pepper, and jalapeño foliage.
