= Gnathium californicum =

Scientific classification
- Domain: Eukaryota
- Kingdom: Animalia
- Phylum: Arthropoda
- Class: Insecta
- Order: Coleoptera
- Suborder: Polyphaga
- Infraorder: Cucujiformia
- Family: Meloidae
- Tribe: Nemognathini
- Genus: Gnathium
- Species: G. californicum

Binomial name
- Gnathium californicum (Wickham, 1905)

Species of beetle

Gnathium californicum is a species of blister beetle in the family Meloidae. It is found in North America.
