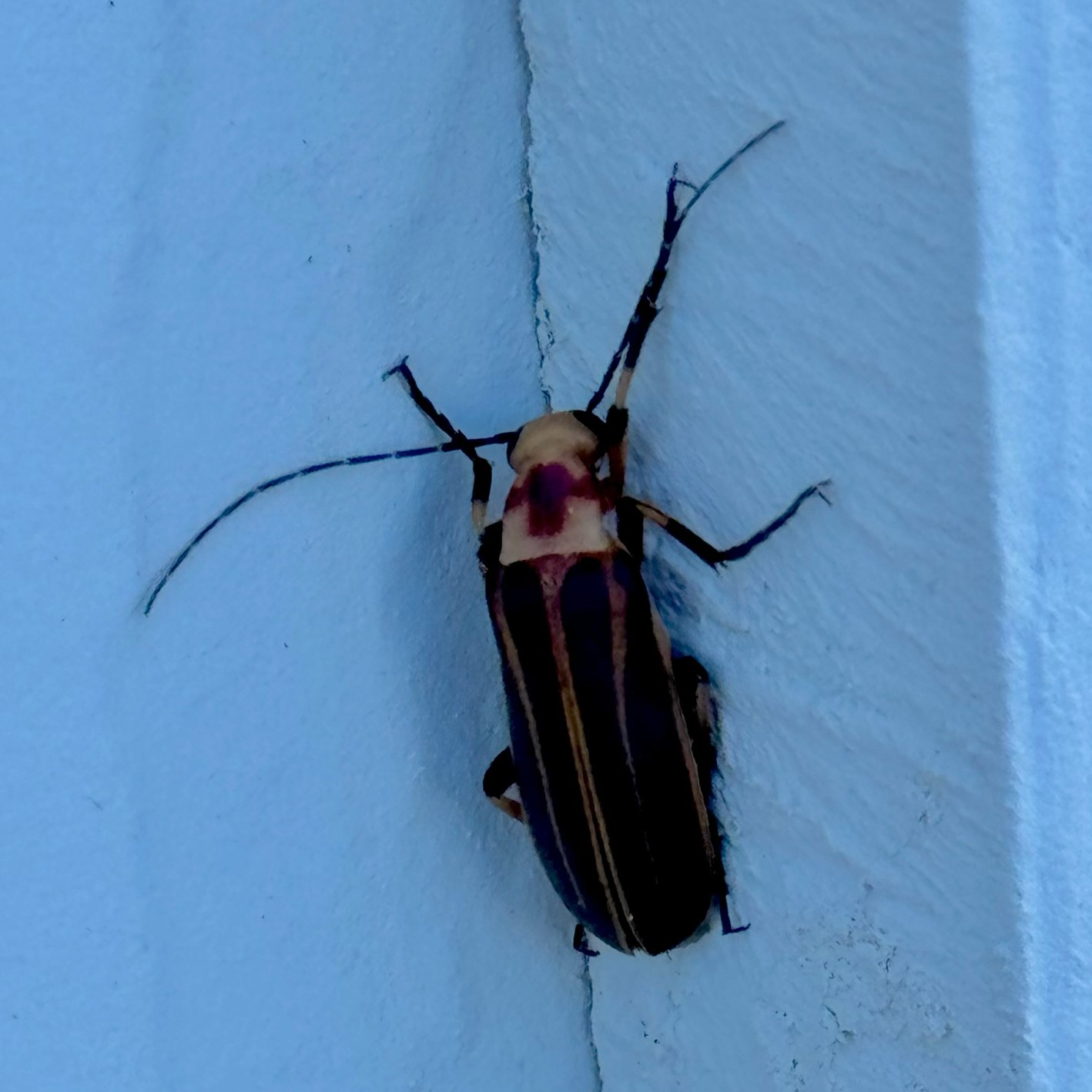

Scientific classification
- Kingdom: Animalia
- Phylum: Arthropoda
- Class: Insecta
- Order: Coleoptera
- Suborder: Polyphaga
- Infraorder: Cucujiformia
- Family: Meloidae
- Tribe: Nemognathini
- Genus: Pseudozonitis
- Species: P. vaurieae

Binomial name
- Pseudozonitis vaurieae Enns, 1956

= Pseudozonitis vaurieae =

Species of beetle

Pseudozonitis vaurieae is a species of blister beetle in the family Meloidae. It is found in Central America and North America.
