= Nemognatha selanderi =

Scientific classification
- Kingdom: Animalia
- Phylum: Arthropoda
- Clade: Pancrustacea
- Class: Insecta
- Order: Coleoptera
- Suborder: Polyphaga
- Infraorder: Cucujiformia
- Family: Meloidae
- Tribe: Nemognathini
- Genus: Nemognatha
- Species: N. selanderi

Binomial name
- Nemognatha selanderi Enns, 1956

Species of beetle

Nemognatha selanderi is a species of blister beetle in the family Meloidae. It is found in North America.
