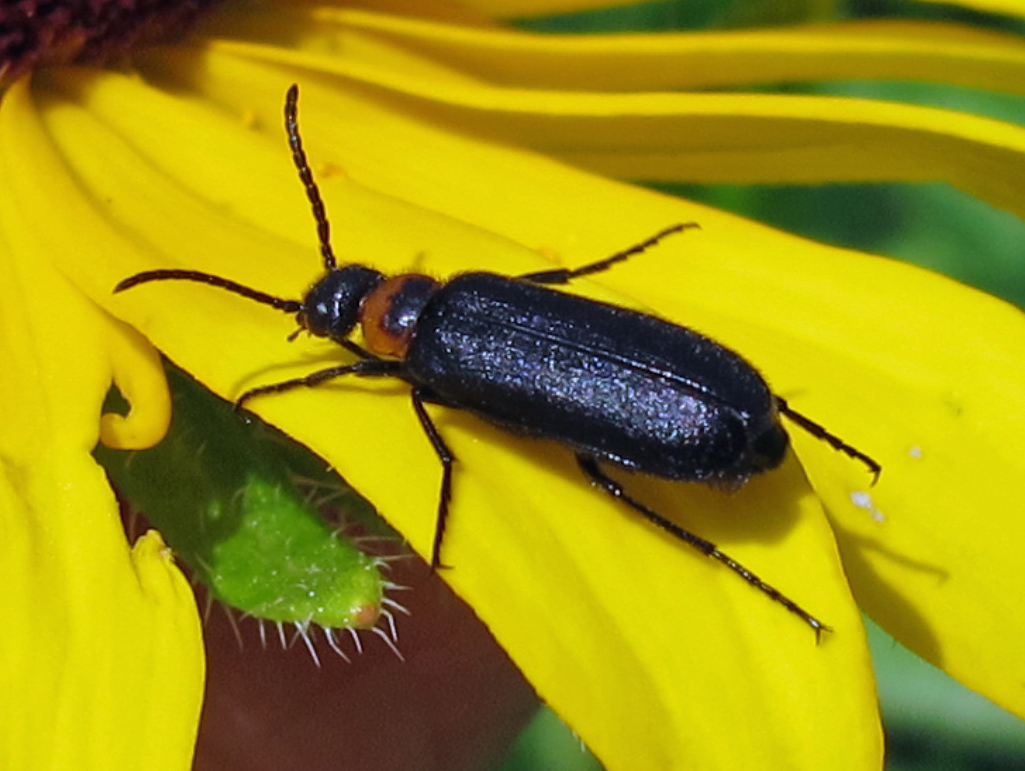

Scientific classification
- Kingdom: Animalia
- Phylum: Arthropoda
- Clade: Pancrustacea
- Class: Insecta
- Order: Coleoptera
- Suborder: Polyphaga
- Infraorder: Cucujiformia
- Family: Meloidae
- Tribe: Nemognathini
- Genus: Nemognatha
- Species: N. nemorensis

Binomial name
- Nemognatha nemorensis Hentz, 1830

= Nemognatha nemorensis =

Species of beetle

Nemognatha nemorensis, commonly known as the Eastern Black-headed Nemognatha, is a species of blister beetle in the family Meloidae. It is found in North America.
