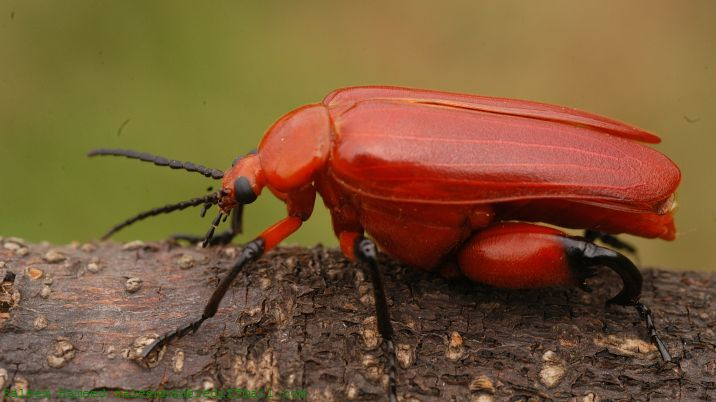
- Horia sp., Bangalore (near Horia roepkei)

Scientific classification
- Kingdom: Animalia
- Phylum: Arthropoda
- Clade: Pancrustacea
- Class: Insecta
- Order: Coleoptera
- Suborder: Polyphaga
- Infraorder: Cucujiformia
- Family: Meloidae
- Subfamily: Nemognathinae
- Tribe: Horiini
- Genus: Horia; Fabricius, 1787

Type species
- Hoplozonitis mira Blackburn, 1892

= Horia (beetle) =

Genus of beetles

Horia is a genus of beetles in the family Meloidae. They are placed in the tribe Horiini which includes the similar genus Synhoria; species have been recorded from the Middle East, China, Indochina and Malesia.

== Species ==
As of November 2026, this genus includes:

- Horia anguliceps Fairmaire, 1885
- Horia auriculata Champion, 1892
- Horia blairi Betrem, 1932 - Australasia
- Horia cephalogona Fairmaire, 1888
- Horia debyi (Fairmaire, 1885) - Asia
- Horia fabriciana Betrem, 1929
- Horia gahani Betrem, 1932
- Horia hottentota Péringuey, 1888
- Horia insularis Cros, 1928
- Horia mira (Blackburn, 1892) - Australasia
- Horia roepkei Bertem, 1929 - Asia
- Horia nitida Gahan, 1909
- Horia testacea (Fabricius, 1781)

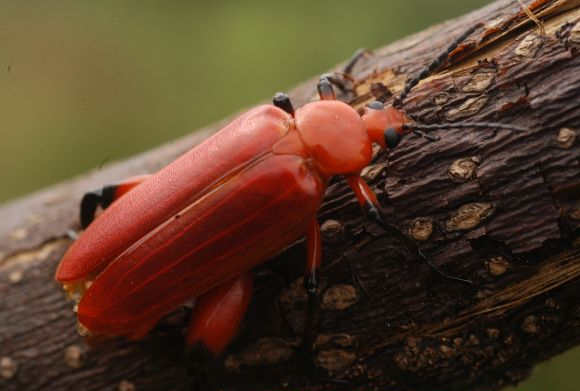
Horia sp. near roepkei

Some species in the genus live in the nests of Xylocopa bees, where they are parasitoids of the brood. Horia maculata was introduced to Hawaii to control Xylocopa but the beetles did not establish a stable population.

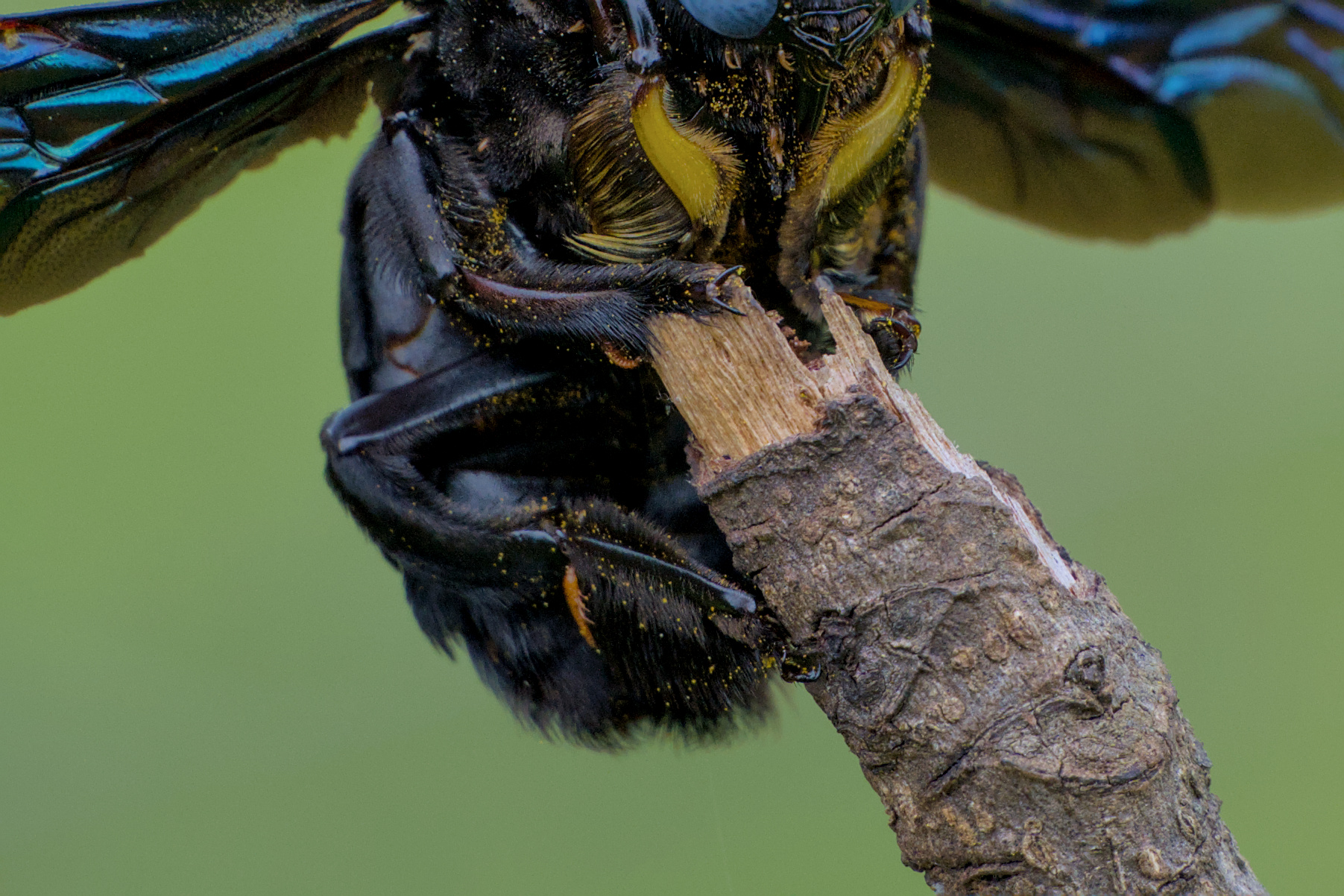
Parasitic larva of Horia on the hind leg of a carpenter bee (Xylocopa tenuiscapa)
