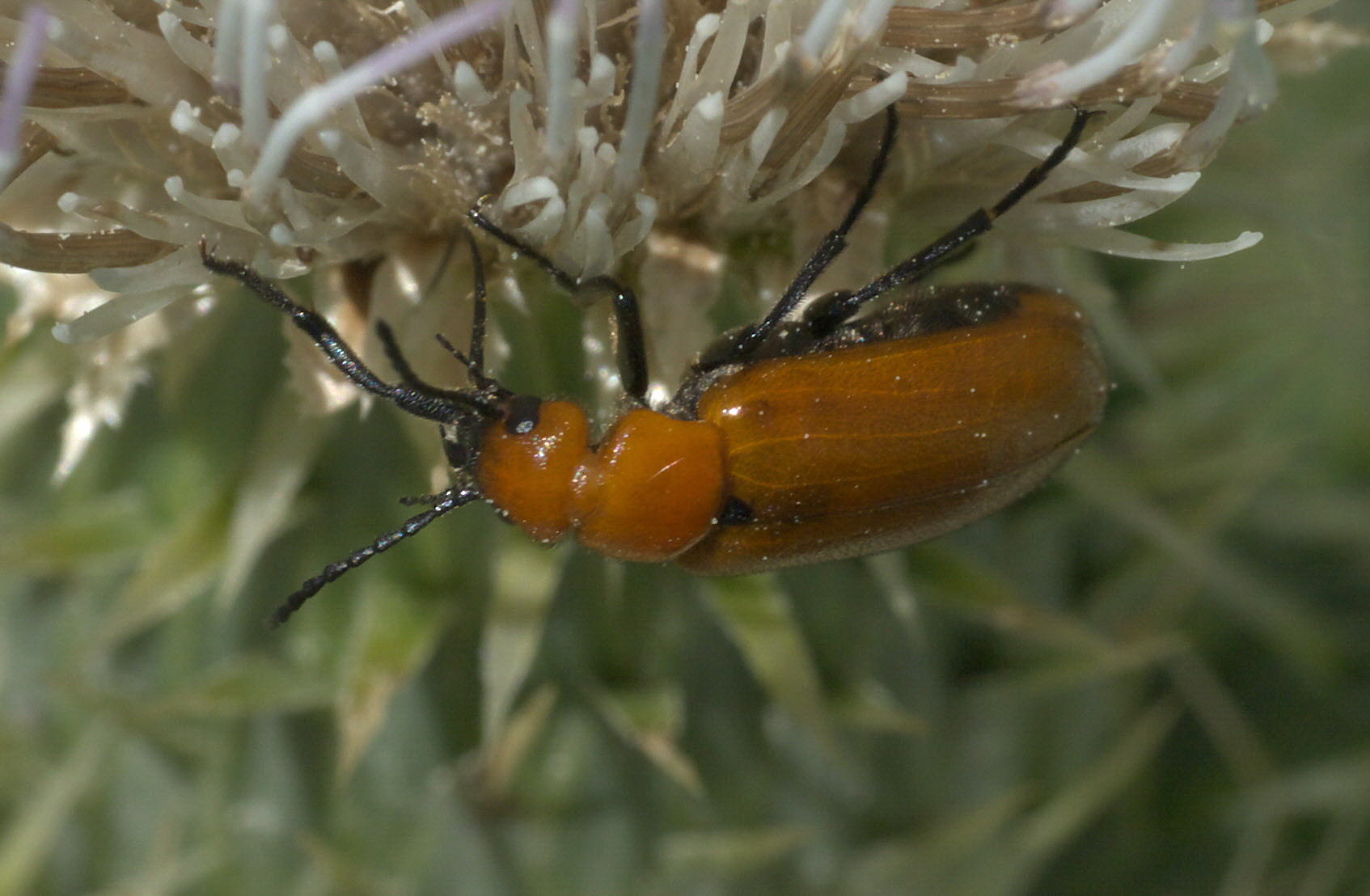

Scientific classification
- Kingdom: Animalia
- Phylum: Arthropoda
- Class: Insecta
- Order: Coleoptera
- Suborder: Polyphaga
- Infraorder: Cucujiformia
- Family: Meloidae
- Tribe: Nemognathini
- Genus: Nemognatha
- Species: N. lutea

Binomial name
- Nemognatha lutea LeConte, 1853

= Nemognatha lutea =

Species of beetle

Nemognatha lutea is a species of blister beetle in the family Meloidae. It is found in North America.

== Subspecies ==
These three subspecies belong to the species Nemognatha lutea:

- Nemognatha lutea dichroa LeConte, 1853
- Nemognatha lutea dubia LeConte, 1853
- Nemognatha lutea lutea LeConte, 1853
