= Pseudozonitis roseomaculatis =

Scientific classification
- Kingdom: Animalia
- Phylum: Arthropoda
- Class: Insecta
- Order: Coleoptera
- Suborder: Polyphaga
- Infraorder: Cucujiformia
- Family: Meloidae
- Tribe: Nemognathini
- Genus: Pseudozonitis
- Species: P. roseomaculatis

Binomial name
- Pseudozonitis roseomaculatis Dillon, 1952

Species of beetle

Pseudozonitis roseomaculatis is a species of blister beetle in the family Meloidae. It is found in North America.
