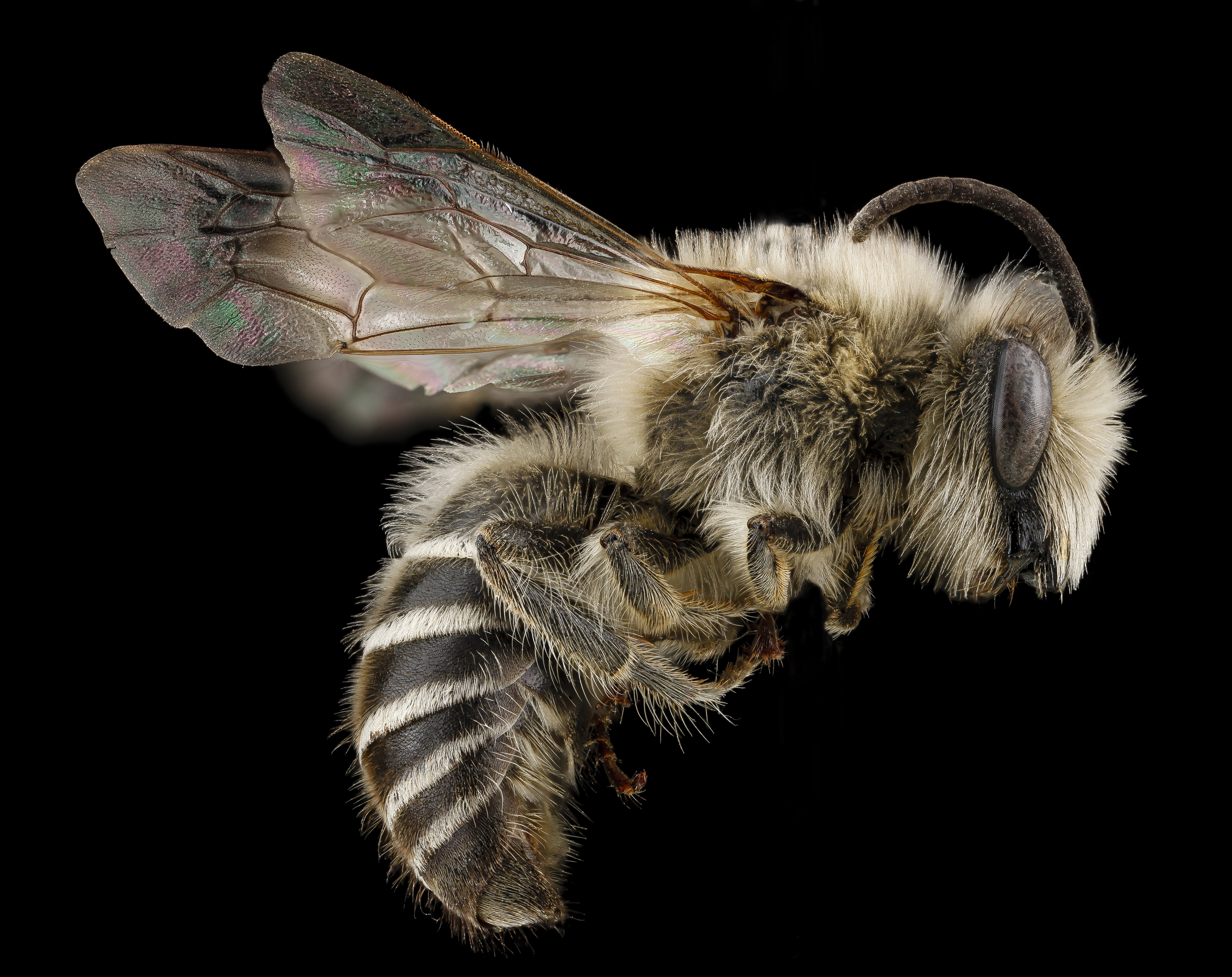

Scientific classification
- Domain: Eukaryota
- Kingdom: Animalia
- Phylum: Arthropoda
- Class: Insecta
- Order: Hymenoptera
- Family: Colletidae
- Genus: Colletes
- Species: C. validus

Binomial name
- Colletes validus Cresson, 1868

= Colletes validus =

Species of bee

Colletes validus, colloquially known as the blueberry cellophane bee, is a solitary, specialist bee in the family Colletidae. It is found primarily in eastern North America where it nests in sandy soils near ericaceous plants.

== Description ==
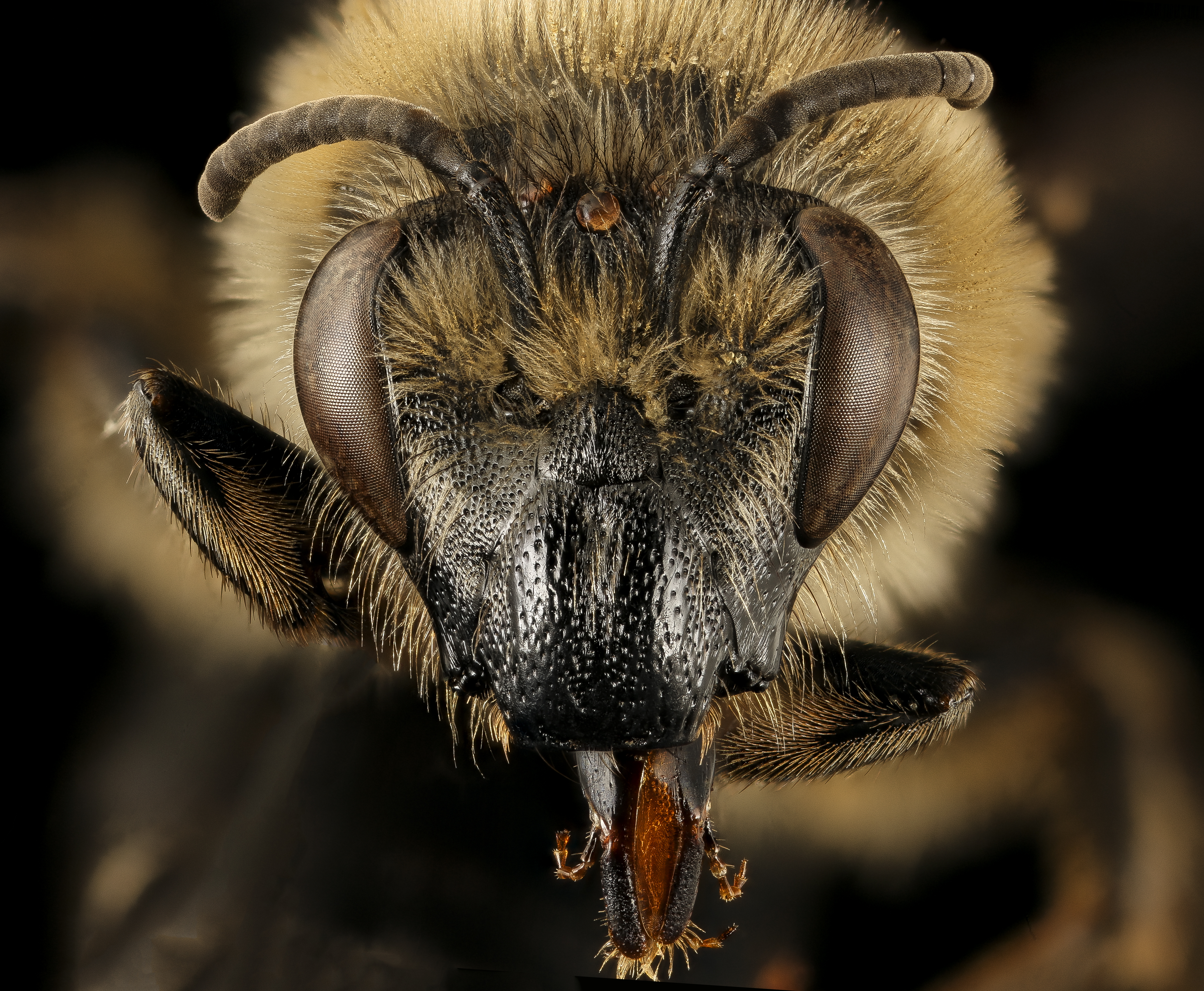
Colletes validus face. Note the long, triangular impression. This shape give Colletes validus easy access to deep ericaceous flowers.

C. validus is a medium-sized cellophane bee: females are 13–14 mm (0.51–0.55 in) long and males are 10–12 mm (0.39–0.47 in) long. As is the case with members of the genus Colletes, all individuals have an S-shaped 2nd recurrent vein on the forewing. Most notably, C. validus males and females have an exaggerated malar space, giving the impression of a long, triangular face. These two characteristics are diagnostic for C. validus within its range. Males are covered densely with brown-yellowish hairs, giving fresh individuals a golden tinge. Females are less hairy and have reduced, but present scopa on the hind legs. It is similar to C. inaequalis Say and C. thoracicus Smith in appearance, range and phenology, however both of these species lack the distinctive long face.

== Distribution ==
Its range extends from the Mid-Atlantic states north through New Hampshire and west through Michigan, with sparse records west to Wisconsin and north to Ontario. C. validus is found throughout this range in sandy areas in proximity to ericaceous plants. Records from Georgia and Florida likely belong to a newly described species, C. ultravalidus.

== Phenology ==
C. validus is a univoltine bee that flies in early spring, coinciding with the flowering of Vaccinium and other ericaceous plants. Near the southern extent of its range, adults fly in late-March, whereas further north flight occurs three to four weeks later. Males emerge precociously, i.e. a few days before females, and patrol nesting aggregations for mates. They locate females via pheromones and mate at the nest site. Females commence nest excavation upon emergence and can use their emergence burrow as the start of their nest. A high degree of natal philopatry, i.e. nesting in your birthplace, is not uncommon for aggregating bees like C. validus. If females emerge too early and their pollen hosts have not started flowering, they can wait for the flowering to begin by sitting in their nest entrance and nectaring on available flowers of other plants. Males disappear from the aggregation two to three weeks after emergence, leaving females as the only flying C. validus at the end of the season.

Nesting proceeds between four and six weeks, with each nest taking between five and ten days to complete. Nests develop underground through the end of summer: eggs hatch into larvae, larvae grow on the semi-liquid provisions provided by the parent bee, and larvae pupate into adults. Anecdotal evidence from nests excavated early March suggests that some prepupae (fully developed larvae) enter diapause before pupating. Whether these prepupa ever complete development is unknown as are the factors driving diapause initiation.

== Nesting Habitat ==
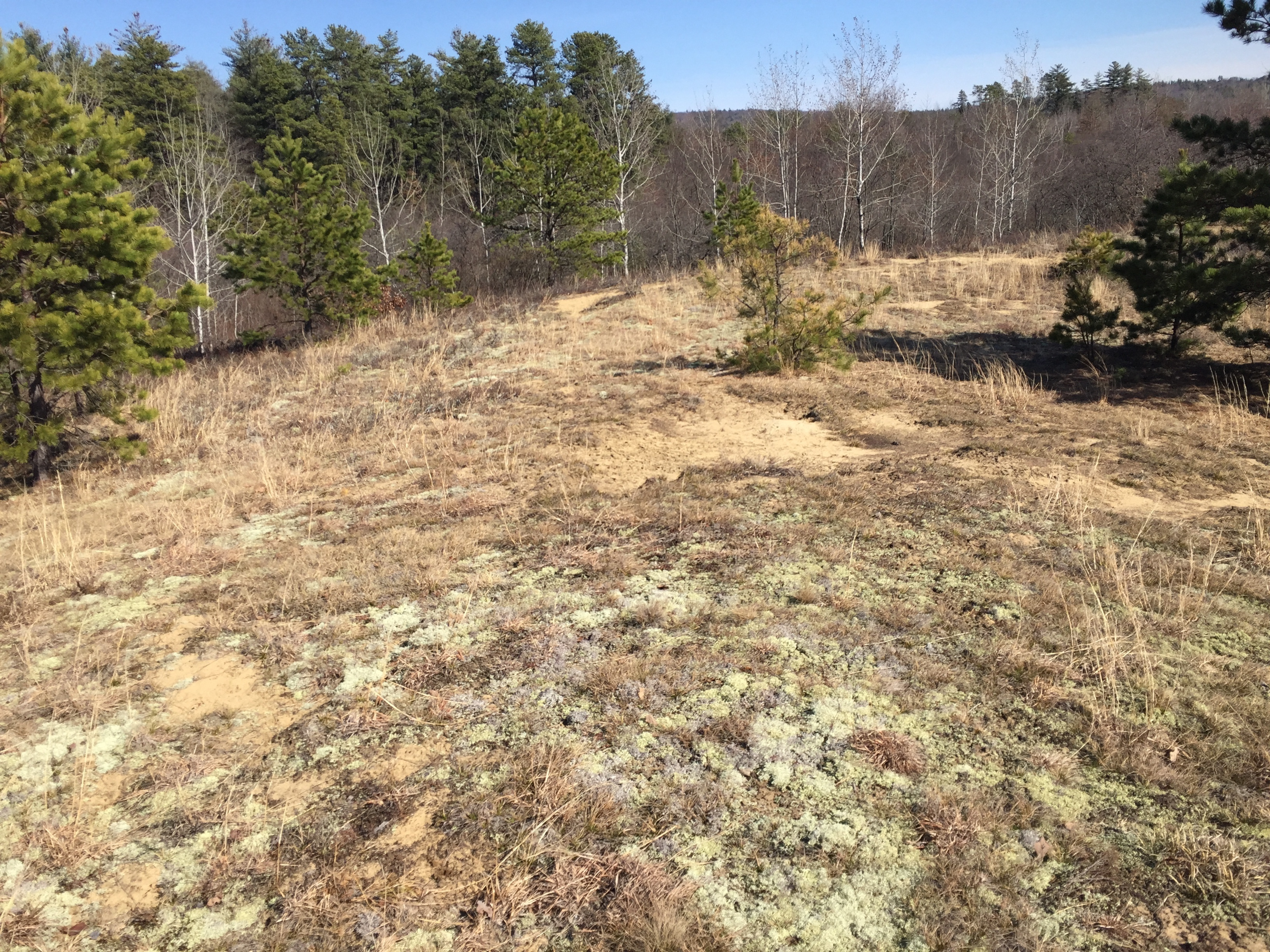
A sandy slope on which Colletes validus typically nests. Photo taken in Concord, NH.

C. validus is a gregarious nester, meaning that nests often occur in aggregations (≈5 nests/m^{2} ). Nesting sites are located in open sandy soils with sparse vegetation, often located close to their ericaceous hosts. Nests can be found on flat ground or south-facing slopes, but rarely under a closed canopy since C. validus prefers warm soils. Dense grass deters nesting.

Surprisingly, C. validus is completely absent from surveys in the lowbush blueberry fields of Maine despite the tremendous abundance of host plant and presence of its generalist congener, C. inaequalis. One explanation is that cold springtime soils discourage nesting, but this hypothesis has not been rigorously tested. Clearly, there are other factors besides open, sandy soil and host plant presence determining the nesting of C. validus within its range.

== Host Plant and Foraging ==
The common name of C. validus—blueberry cellophane bee—suggests a tighter relationship with its host plant than may actually exist. Evidence suggests it is not limited to blueberry (Vaccinium spp.) and it will forage for pollen broadly on a diversity of ericaceous plants with urceolate flowers, e.g. bearberry (Arctostaphylos uva-ursi) and black huckleberry (Gaylussacia baccata). Pollen provisions can contain up to 15% Pinus spp. pollen and males and females have been observed visiting non-ericaceous plants (e.g. Acer rubrum, Prunus spp., Amelanchier spp.) for both pollen and nectar. Part of the provisions are held within the crop during foraging and regurgitated upon return to the nest.

== Nesting Biology ==
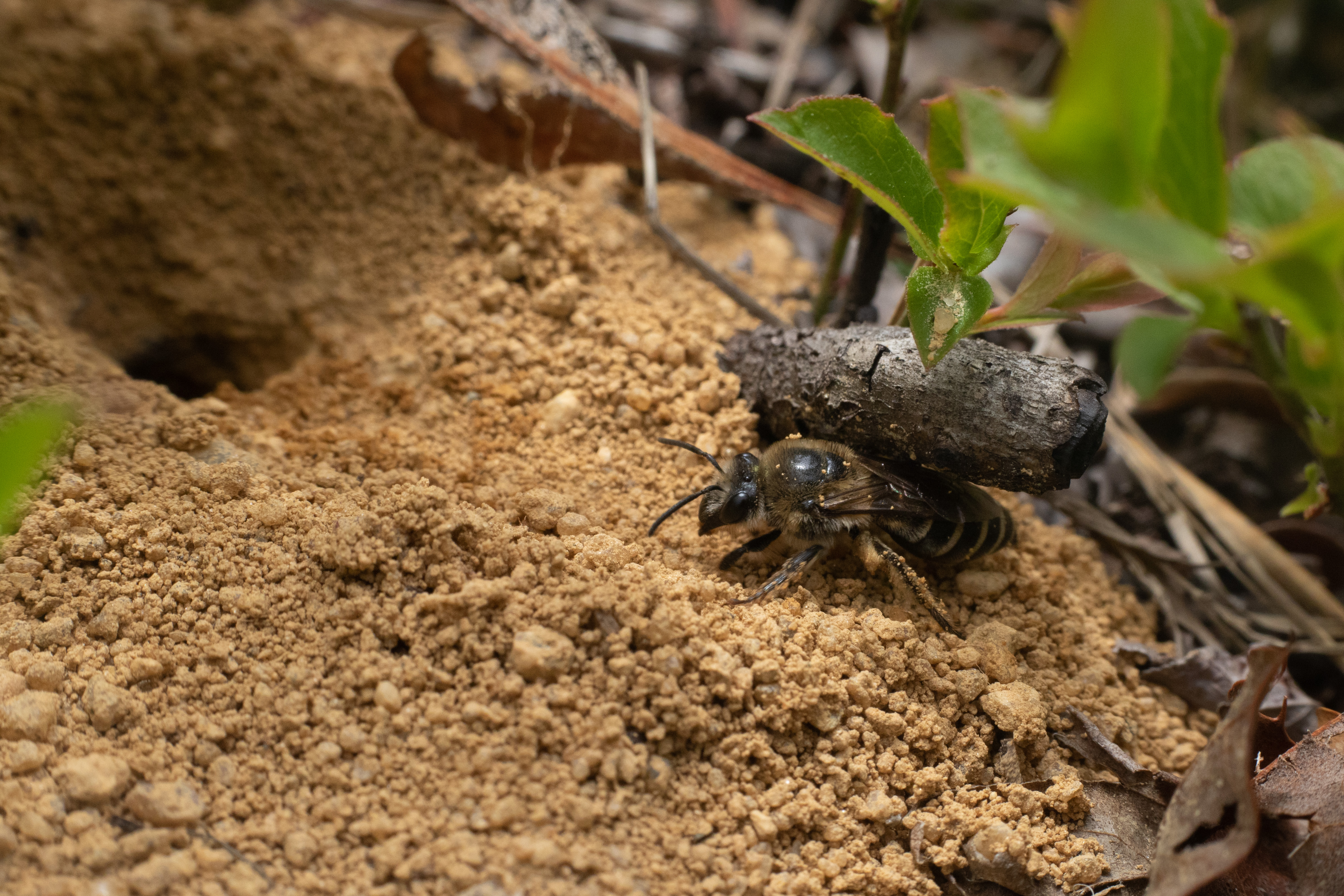
Blueberry cellophane bee (Colletes validus) female excavates a nest near host blueberry plants in Falmouth, MA.

Nests descend from 17 to 60 cm (6.7 to 23.6 in) and measure ≈8 mm (0.31 in) in diameter. Tunnel walls are not compacted since C. validus lacks a pygidial plate normally used for tamping down soil (a trait shared by all Colletes). Cells are constructed at the end of short lateral tunnels arranged radially around the main tunnel. Laterals are constructed from the bottom to the top. She proceeds by “painting” a Dufour's gland secretion mixed with saliva onto the walls of the cell using her short, bilobed glossa. This mixture polymerizes into a polyester- or cellophane-like substance, which is where bees in the genus Colletes get their common name. Cell construction primarily occurs at night and provisioning of the cell follows the next morning. To provision the cell, the female first forages for ericaceous pollen and packs it into the bottom third of the cell. Next, she adds nectar until a viscous soup is formed. The waterproof cellophane lining of the cell permits the usage of semi-liquid provisions. Bacteria (Lactobacillus spp.) and/or yeast likely colonize the provisions based on visible gas bubbles and sour taste (pH 3–4). Fermentation is common in other colletids that create liquid provisions, e.g. Ptiloglossa guinnae. The female hangs a single egg (≈2.65mm in length) from the top of the cell so that the egg is not submerged in the provisions. A maximum of five cells have been associated with any given nest. It is unknown whether females create more than one nest during their lifetime.

== Natural Enemies ==
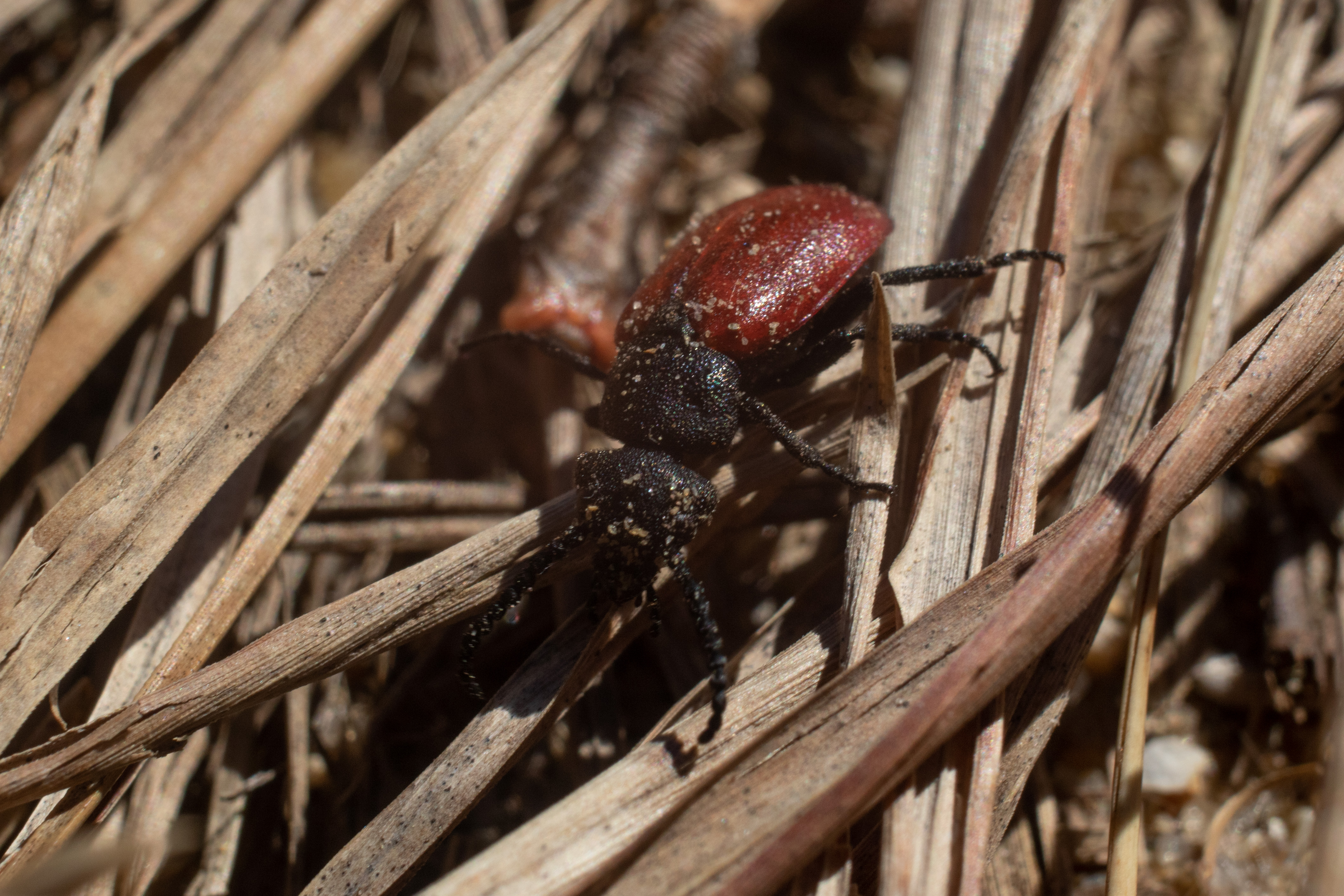
Blister beetles (Tricrania sanguinipennis) parasitize Colletes validus nests. Adult beetles lay eggs in sand that hatch into triungulin larvae. Larvae actively seek out adult bees in order to be transported down into the bee nest.

A variety of arthropods prey on C. validus nests. Adults of the blister beetle Tricrania sanguinipennis (Coleoptera) have been found in completed C. validus cells. Bee flies (Bombylius mexicanus, B. pygmaeus in Beltsville, MD) have been observed ovipositing in the nest entrances of Colletes validus, but no larvae have been recovered from cells. Robber flies (Nicocles pictus) predate adult C. validus (Batra 1980). There are no known hymenopteran cleptoparasites of C. validus.

== Pheromones ==
Entomologists have long-noted the citrus-like odor emitted by Colletes when handled. Female C. validus will swarm around netted females emitting this odor. Past research has found that C. validus will aggregate around 1-terpinen-4-ol and a 3:1:1: mixture of linalool-neral-geranial. The exact aromatic profile of the Colletes attractant pheromone is unclear but could prove valuable for attracting C. validus to nesting sites for commercial pollination efforts.

== Relationship to humans ==
C. validus can nest on footpaths through sand plain preserves or in open backyards built on sandy oak-pine forests (e.g. Barnstable County, Massachusetts), resulting in possible conflict with humans and pets. However, concern is unwarranted as C. validus is docile and will not sting unprovoked. Like many other bees, they will forage for salts from human sweat on hot days.

== Crop Pollination ==
The potential of C. validus as a commercial blueberry pollinator has been acknowledged, but never fully explored. C. validus has many of the characteristics of a bee that could be commercially managed for pollination including a preference for blueberry flowers, a phenology that almost exclusively overlaps with the bloom time of blueberry, and an ability to extract pollen from the deep, goblet flowers. Understanding how to attract wild C. validus to nesting aggregations and initiate nesting would be a useful first step towards securing reliable pollination on farms.
