= Pseudozonitis brevis =

Scientific classification
- Domain: Eukaryota
- Kingdom: Animalia
- Phylum: Arthropoda
- Class: Insecta
- Order: Coleoptera
- Suborder: Polyphaga
- Infraorder: Cucujiformia
- Family: Meloidae
- Tribe: Nemognathini
- Genus: Pseudozonitis
- Species: P. brevis

Binomial name
- Pseudozonitis brevis Enns, 1956

Species of beetle

Pseudozonitis brevis is a species of blister beetle in the family Meloidae. It is found in North America.
