= Nemognatha notaticeps =

Scientific classification
- Kingdom: Animalia
- Phylum: Arthropoda
- Clade: Pancrustacea
- Class: Insecta
- Order: Coleoptera
- Suborder: Polyphaga
- Infraorder: Cucujiformia
- Family: Meloidae
- Genus: Nemognatha
- Species: N. notaticeps

Binomial name
- Nemognatha notaticeps Pic, 1909

Species of beetle

Nemognatha notaticeps is a species of blister beetle from the family Meloidae.
