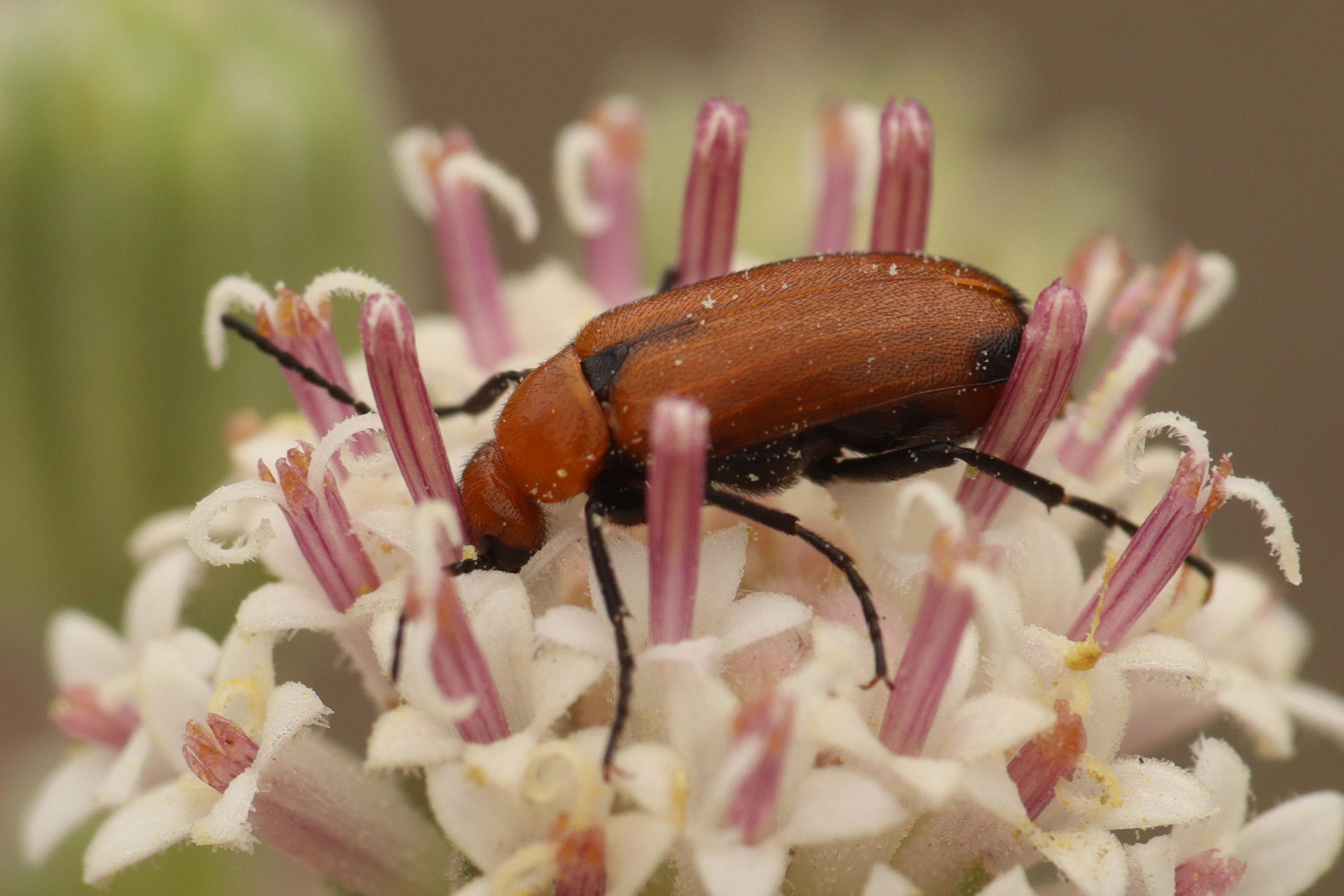

Scientific classification
- Kingdom: Animalia
- Phylum: Arthropoda
- Clade: Pancrustacea
- Class: Insecta
- Order: Coleoptera
- Suborder: Polyphaga
- Infraorder: Cucujiformia
- Family: Meloidae
- Genus: Nemognatha
- Species: N. lurida

Binomial name
- Nemognatha lurida (LeConte, 1853)

= Nemognatha lurida =

Species of beetle

Nemognatha lurida is a species of blister beetle in the family Meloidae. It is found in Central America and North America.

== Subspecies ==
These two subspecies belong to the species Nemognatha lurida:

- Nemognatha lurida apicalis LeConte, 1853
- Nemognatha lurida lurida (LeConte, 1853)
