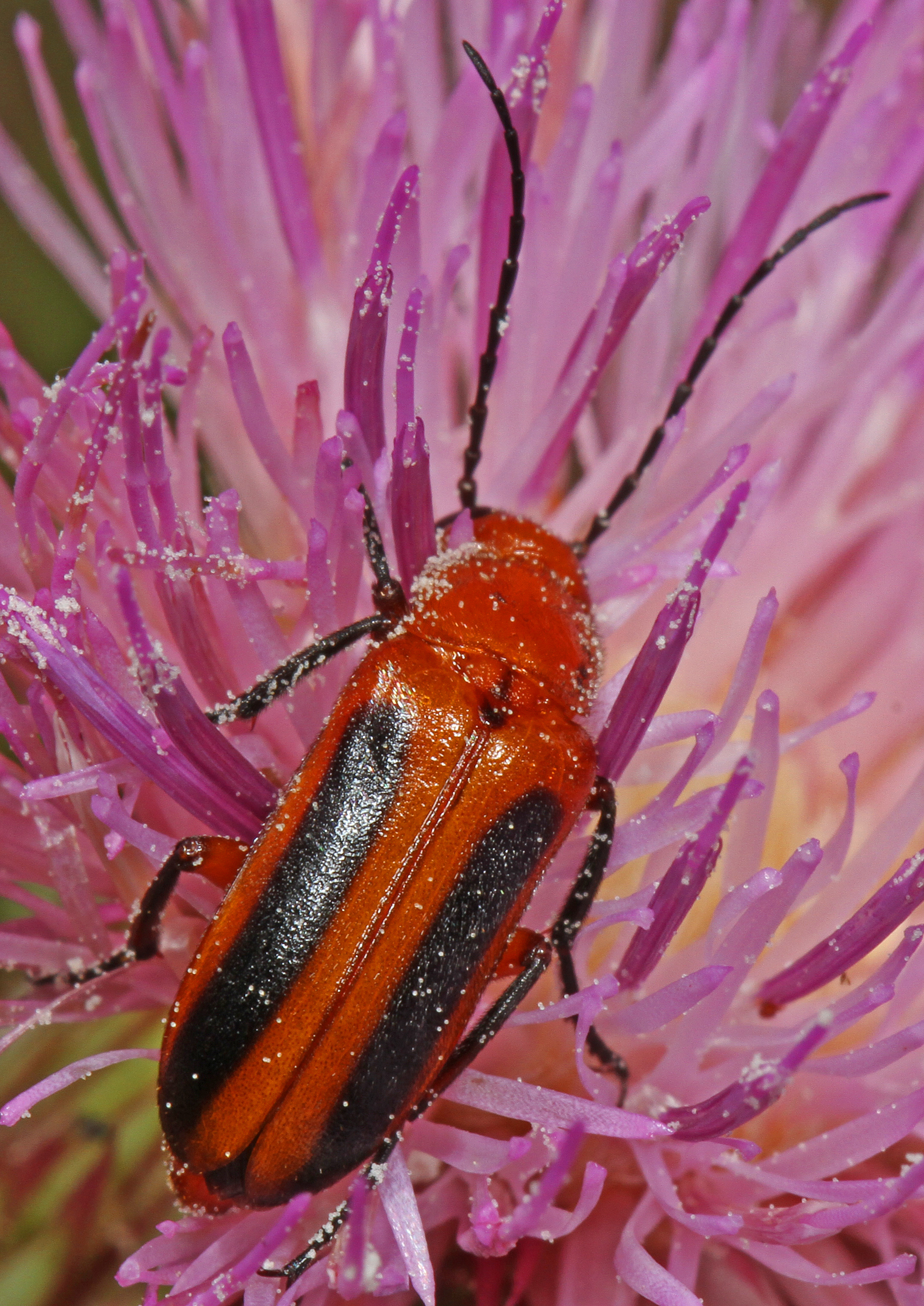

Scientific classification
- Kingdom: Animalia
- Phylum: Arthropoda
- Clade: Pancrustacea
- Class: Insecta
- Order: Coleoptera
- Suborder: Polyphaga
- Infraorder: Cucujiformia
- Family: Meloidae
- Genus: Nemognatha
- Species: N. piazata

Binomial name
- Nemognatha piazata (Fabricius, 1798)

= Nemognatha piazata =

Species of beetle

Nemognatha piazata is a species of blister beetle in the family Meloidae. It is found in North America.

== Subspecies ==
These three subspecies belong to the species Nemognatha piazata:

- Nemognatha piazata bicolor LeConte, 1853
- Nemognatha piazata palliata LeConte, 1853
- Nemognatha piazata piazata (Fabricius, 1798)
