= Nemognatha sparsa =

Scientific classification
- Kingdom: Animalia
- Phylum: Arthropoda
- Clade: Pancrustacea
- Class: Insecta
- Order: Coleoptera
- Suborder: Polyphaga
- Infraorder: Cucujiformia
- Family: Meloidae
- Genus: Nemognatha
- Species: N. sparsa

Binomial name
- Nemognatha sparsa LeConte, 1868

Species of beetle

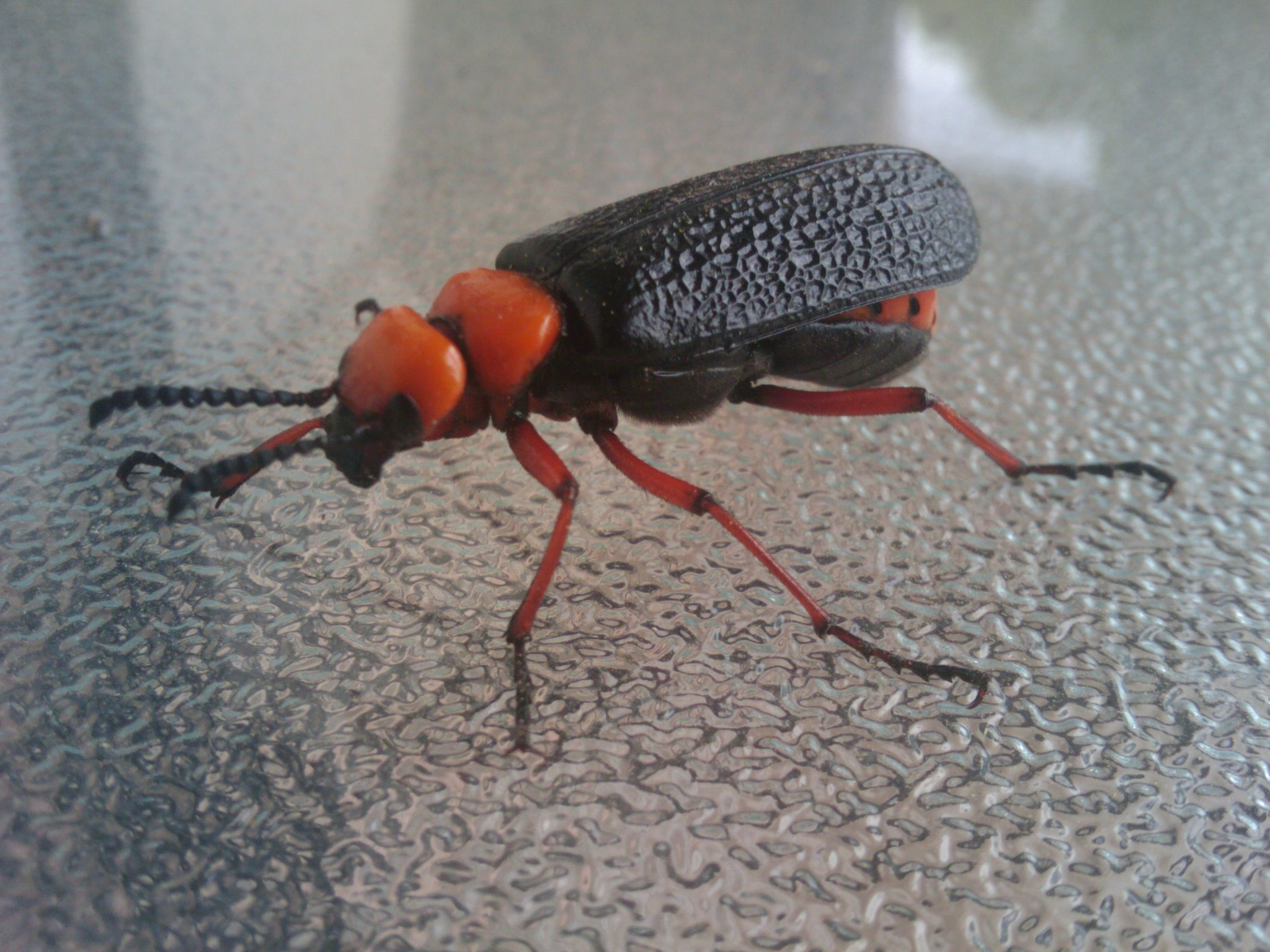
A picture of Blister Beetle (nemognatha sparsa).

Nemognatha sparsa is a species of blister beetle in the family Meloidae. It is found in North America.
