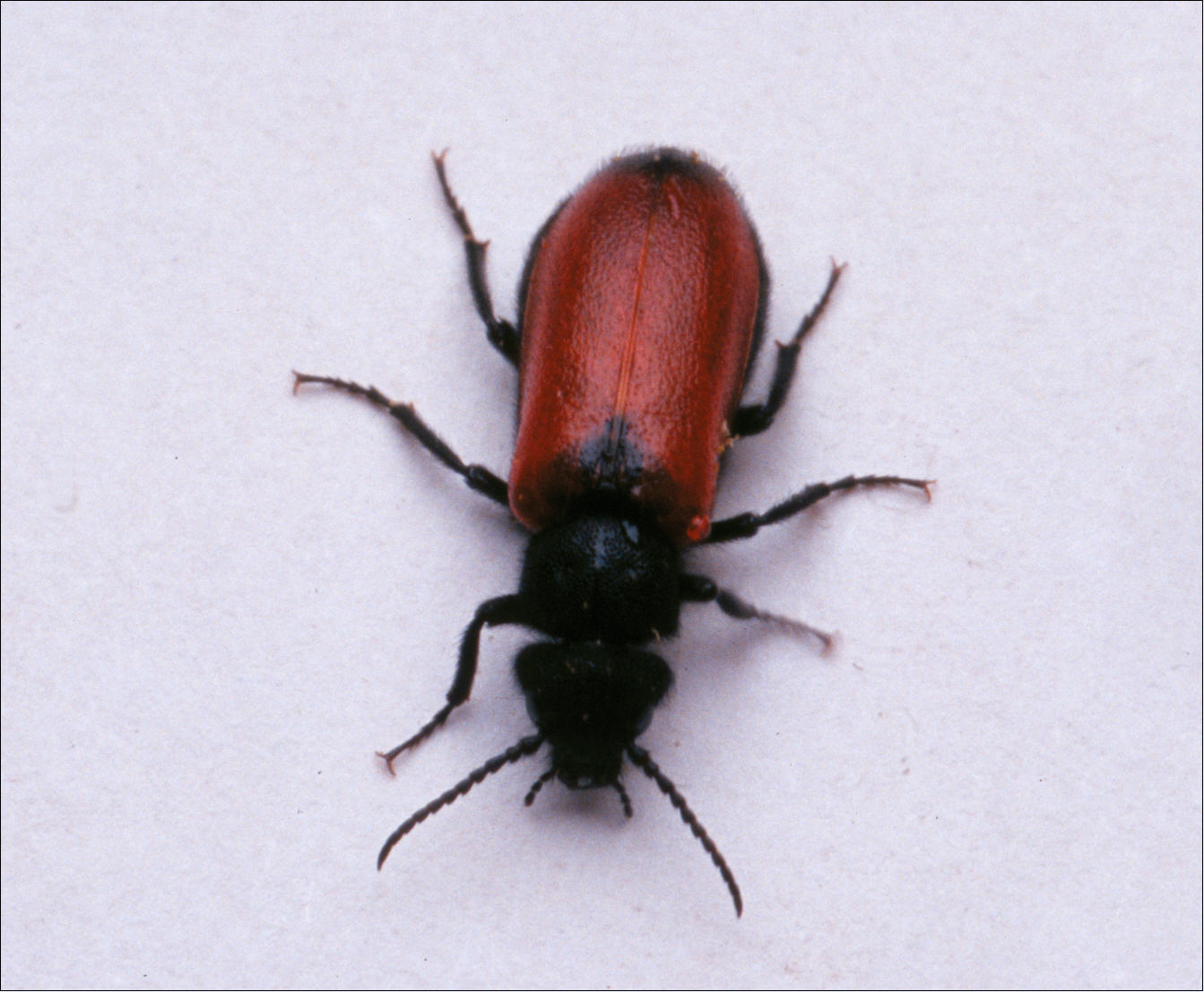
- Tricrania stansburyi

Scientific classification
- Kingdom: Animalia
- Phylum: Arthropoda
- Class: Insecta
- Order: Coleoptera
- Suborder: Polyphaga
- Infraorder: Cucujiformia
- Family: Meloidae
- Tribe: Nemognathini
- Genus: Tricrania; LeConte, 1860

= Tricrania =

Genus of beetles

Tricrania is a genus of blister beetles in the family Meloidae. There are at least two described species in Tricrania.

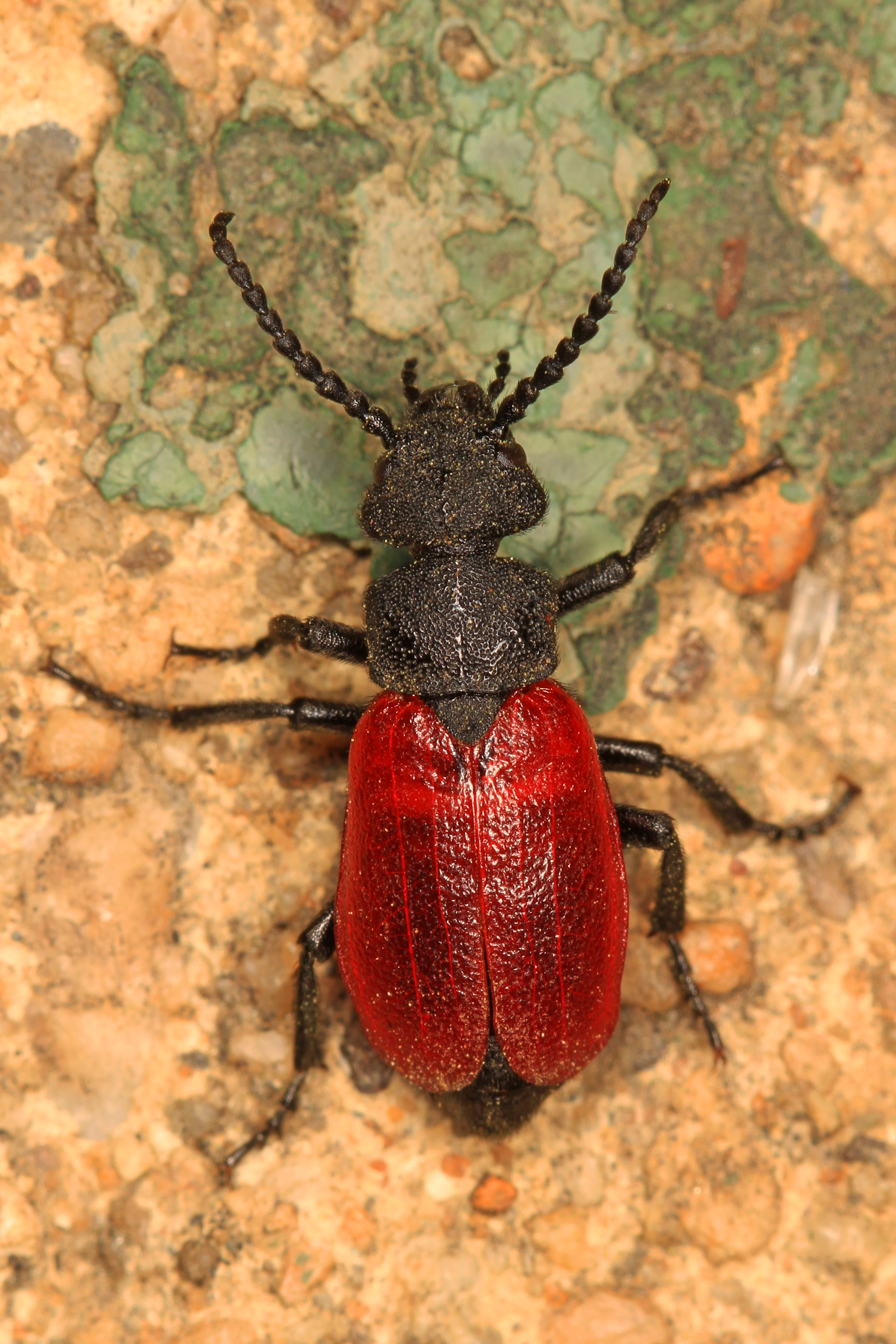
Tricrania sanguinipennis

== Species ==
These two species belong to the genus Tricrania:

- Tricrania sanguinipennis (Say, 1823)^{i c g b}
- Tricrania stansburyi (Haldeman, 1852)^{i c g b}

Data sources: i = ITIS, c = Catalogue of Life, g = GBIF, b = Bugguide.net
