= Stenodera =

- Stenodera palaestina

Scientific classification
- Kingdom: Animalia
- Phylum: Arthropoda
- Clade: Pancrustacea
- Class: Insecta
- Order: Coleoptera
- Suborder: Polyphaga
- Infraorder: Cucujiformia
- Family: Meloidae
- Subfamily: Nemognathinae
- Tribe: Nemognathini
- Genus: Stenodera; Eschscholtz, 1818

Synonyms
- Stenoderina Aksentjev, 1988; Zonitides Abeille de Perrin, 1880

Genus of beetles

Stenodera is a genus of oil or blister beetles (Coleoptera: Meloidae) in the tribe Nemognathini; it was erected by Johann Friedrich von Eschscholtz in 1818. Species records (probably incomplete) are from the Mediterranean region to the Middle East and East Asia.

== Description ==
Stenodera beetles are relatively small (sometimes less than 5 mm) and elongated, compared with other genera in the subfamily. The larvae develop as predators, feeding on the eggs of bees, wasps, or grasshoppers, while the adult beetles are herbivorous and are commonly found on flowers.

== Species ==
As of November 2026, Stenodera species include:

1. Stenodera anatolica (Frivaldszky, 1884)
2. Stenodera caucasica (Pallas, 1781)
3. Stenodera coeruleiceps (Fairmaire, 1892)
4. Stenodera djakonovi Aksentjev, 1978
5. Stenodera foveicollis (Fairmaire, 1897)
6. Stenodera oculifera (Abeille de Perrin, 1880)
7. Stenodera palaestina Mařan, 1942
8. Stenodera puncticollis (Chevrolat, 1829)
