= Horia fabriciana =

Scientific classification
- Kingdom: Animalia
- Phylum: Arthropoda
- Class: Insecta
- Order: Coleoptera
- Suborder: Polyphaga
- Infraorder: Cucujiformia
- Family: Meloidae
- Genus: Horia
- Species: H. fabriciana

Binomial name
- Horia fabriciana Betrem, 1929

Synonyms
- Horia testacea Fabricius, 1787; Horia africana Gahan, 1908; Horia fabriciana Betrem, 1929

Species of beetle

Horia fabriciana, is a species of blister beetle found in India, Sri Lanka, Israel and Egypt.

== Description ==
Body length is about 20 mm.
