= Nemognatha soror =

Scientific classification
- Domain: Eukaryota
- Kingdom: Animalia
- Phylum: Arthropoda
- Class: Insecta
- Order: Coleoptera
- Suborder: Polyphaga
- Infraorder: Cucujiformia
- Family: Meloidae
- Genus: Nemognatha
- Species: N. soror

Binomial name
- Nemognatha soror MacSwain, 1951

Species of beetle

Nemognatha soror is a species of blister beetle in the family Meloidae. It is found in North America.
