= Nemognatha angusta =

Scientific classification
- Domain: Eukaryota
- Kingdom: Animalia
- Phylum: Arthropoda
- Class: Insecta
- Order: Coleoptera
- Suborder: Polyphaga
- Infraorder: Cucujiformia
- Family: Meloidae
- Genus: Nemognatha
- Species: N. angusta

Binomial name
- Nemognatha angusta Enns, 1956

Species of beetle

Nemognatha angusta is a species of blister beetle belonging to the family Meloidae. This insect is found in North America.

== Taxonomy ==
Nemognatha angusta belongs to the subgenus Nemognatha (Meganemognatha), where it is a relative of N. explanata.

== Description ==
Adults measure 8 to 11 millimetres (0.31 to 0.43 in) in length, and are tawny in color. Besides its color, it is also distinguished from N. explanata by its shorter galeae (outer lobes of the maxillae) and basally narrowed pronotum.

== Distribution ==
The holotype of N. angusta was found in Mississippi, with paratypes from Mississippi and Louisiana.
