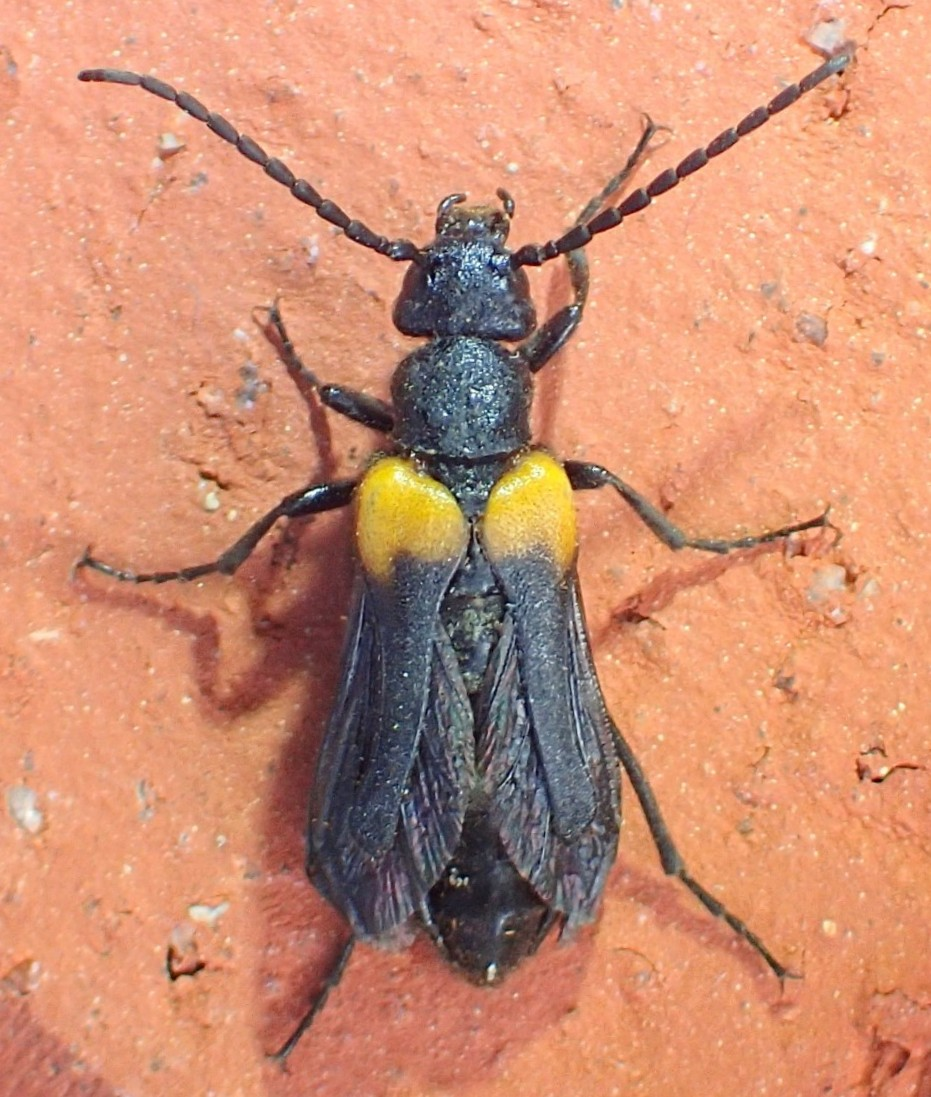

Scientific classification
- Kingdom: Animalia
- Phylum: Arthropoda
- Clade: Pancrustacea
- Class: Insecta
- Order: Coleoptera
- Suborder: Polyphaga
- Infraorder: Cucujiformia
- Family: Meloidae
- Genus: Sitaris
- Species: S. muralis

Binomial name
- Sitaris muralis (Forster, 1771)

Synonyms
- Apalus mauritanicus Normand, 1949; Cantharis attenuatus Fourcroy, 1785; Necydalis humuralis Fabricius, 1775; Necydalis muralis Forster, 1771; Sitaris nitidicollis Abeille de Perrin, 1869; Sitaris splendidus Schaufuss, 1861

= Sitaris muralis =

Species of beetle

Sitaris muralis is a species of blister beetle in the subfamily Nemognathinae in the family Meloidae. It is found in Western Europe. It is a black beetle with buff-orange patches on the front of the elytra. It is a kleptoparasite of digger bees.

== Distribution ==
Sitaris muralis is found in Western Europe where its range includes the British Isles, Spain, France, Luxembourg, Germany, Austria, Czech Republic and Italy, It appears to be an eastern Palaearctic species and is very rare in southern England, where it is on the northwestern fringe of its range. The adult beetle is found in the vicinity of the nests of the digger bees it parasitises, typically in steep loess slopes or in old, sun-warmed walls of houses and in gravel infill under their balconies.

== Ecology ==
This beetle is a kleptoparasite of bees in the genus Anthophora and has a complex life cycle. In September, the female beetle lays a batch of two thousand or more eggs in the vicinity of galleries and chambers formed by the host bee for rearing its own offspring. When the beetle eggs hatch, the larvae emerge and form a small heap mixed up with the remains of the egg cases. The larvae soon enter diapause until the following May. The larvae then seek out a male digger bee onto which a few beetle larvae climb, clinging to the bee's hairs. In due course this male mates with a female bee and the beetle larvae transfer to her. She hollows out chambers in walls and cliffs, provisioning each with nectar, and laying an egg in each, which floats like a raft on the surface of the honey. She then seals the chamber. At the appropriate moment, one beetle larva loosens its grip on the bee and drops onto the egg raft. Here it feeds, first on the egg, which takes about a week, and later on the honey; it is unable to metabolise the honey until it has consumed the egg and shed its skin.
