= Rhyphonemognatha =

Scientific classification
- Kingdom: Animalia
- Phylum: Arthropoda
- Clade: Pancrustacea
- Class: Insecta
- Order: Coleoptera
- Suborder: Polyphaga
- Infraorder: Cucujiformia
- Family: Meloidae
- Tribe: Nemognathini
- Genus: Rhyphonemognatha; Enns, 1956
- Species: R. rufa

Binomial name
- Rhyphonemognatha rufa (LeConte, 1854)

Genus of beetles

Rhyphonemognatha is a genus of North American blister beetles in the family Meloidae. There is one described species: Rhyphonemognatha rufa.
