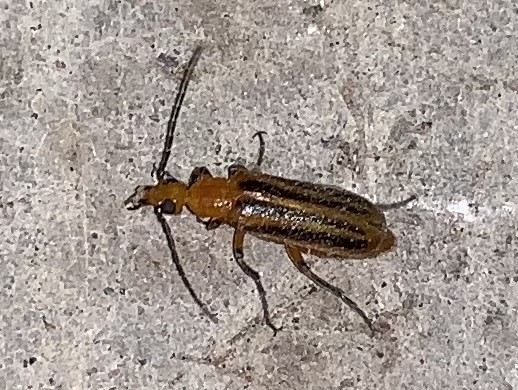
- Pseudozonitis vittipennis

Scientific classification
- Kingdom: Animalia
- Phylum: Arthropoda
- Class: Insecta
- Order: Coleoptera
- Suborder: Polyphaga
- Infraorder: Cucujiformia
- Family: Meloidae
- Subfamily: Nemognathinae
- Tribe: Nemognathini
- Genus: Pseudozonitis; Dillon, 1952

= Pseudozonitis =

Genus of beetles

Pseudozonitis is a genus of blister beetles in the family Meloidae. There are about 17 described species in the genus Pseudozonitis.

== Species ==
The following species are recognised in the genus Pseudozonitis:

- Pseudozonitis arizonica (Van Dyke, 1929)
- Pseudozonitis brevis Enns, 1956
- Pseudozonitis castaneis Dillon, 1952
- Pseudozonitis labialis Enns, 1956
- Pseudozonitis longicornis (Horn, 1870)
- Pseudozonitis maculicollis (MacSwain, 1951)
- Pseudozonitis marginata (Fabricius, 1781)
- Pseudozonitis martini (Fall, 1907)
- Pseudozonitis obscuricornis (Chevrolat, 1877)
- Pseudozonitis pallidus Dillon, 1952
- Pseudozonitis roseomaculatis Dillon, 1952
- Pseudozonitis schaefferi (Blatchley, 1922)
- Pseudozonitis stroudi Enns, 1956
- Pseudozonitis vaurieae Enns, 1956
- Pseudozonitis vigilans (Fall, 1907)
- Pseudozonitis vittipennis (Horn, 1875)
- Pseudozonitis vogti Dillon, 1952
