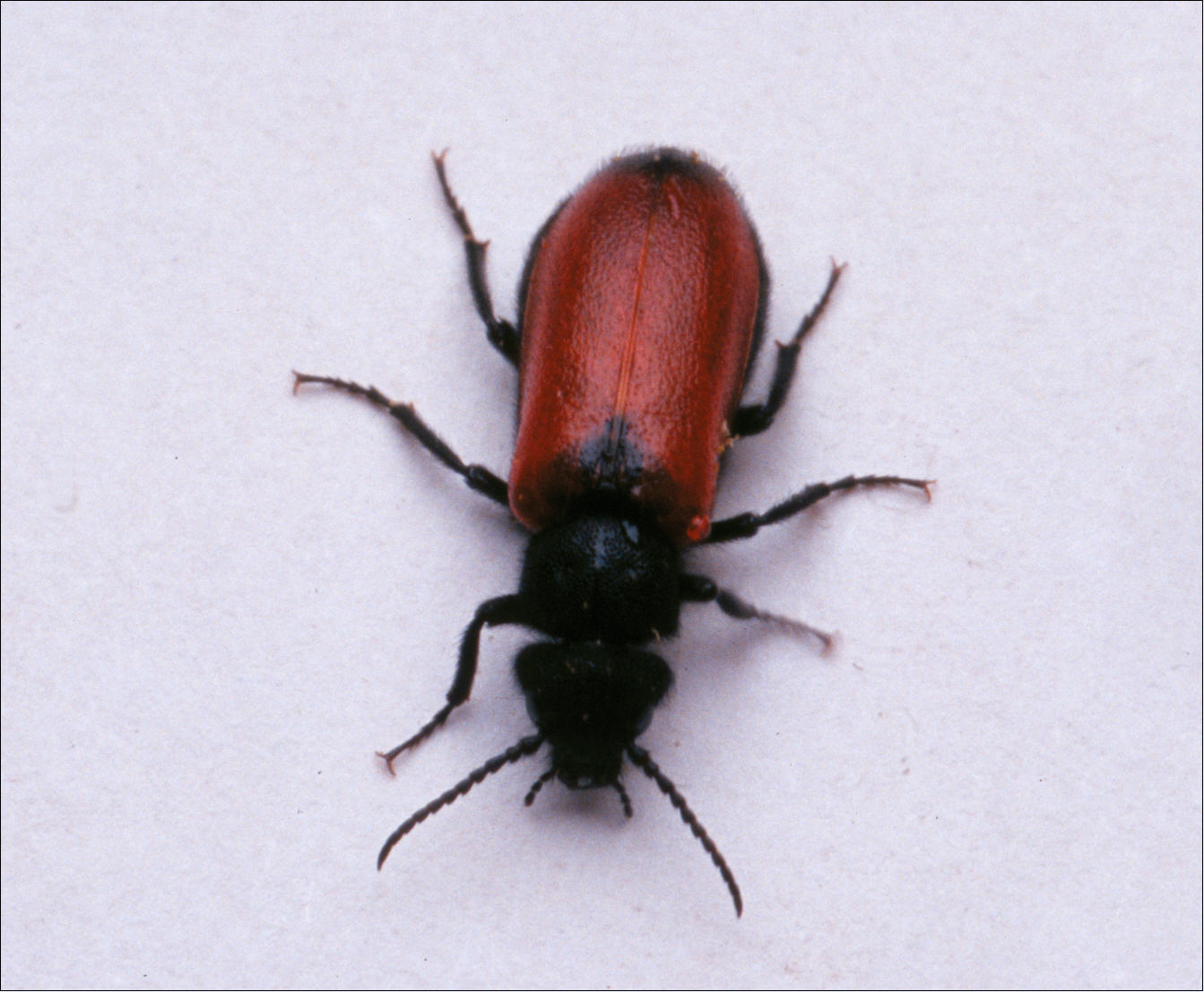

Scientific classification
- Domain: Eukaryota
- Kingdom: Animalia
- Phylum: Arthropoda
- Class: Insecta
- Order: Coleoptera
- Suborder: Polyphaga
- Infraorder: Cucujiformia
- Family: Meloidae
- Genus: Tricrania
- Species: T. stansburyi

Binomial name
- Tricrania stansburyi (Haldeman, 1852)

Synonyms
- Tricrania murrayi LeConte.

= Tricrania stansburyi =

Species of beetle

Tricrania stansburyi is a species of blister beetle in the family Meloidae. It is found in North America.
