= Horia debyi =

Scientific classification
- Kingdom: Animalia
- Phylum: Arthropoda
- Class: Insecta
- Order: Coleoptera
- Suborder: Polyphaga
- Infraorder: Cucujiformia
- Family: Meloidae
- Genus: Horia
- Species: H. debyi

Binomial name
- Horia debyi (Fairmaire, 1885)

Synonyms
- Cissites debyi Fairmaire, 1885; Horia debyi Gahan, 1908

Species of beetle

Horia debyi, is a species of blister beetle found in Sri Lanka, Singapore, Brunei and Malaysia.

== Description ==
Body length is about 25.1 to 26.3 mm.
