= Gnathium francilloni =

Scientific classification
- Domain: Eukaryota
- Kingdom: Animalia
- Phylum: Arthropoda
- Class: Insecta
- Order: Coleoptera
- Suborder: Polyphaga
- Infraorder: Cucujiformia
- Family: Meloidae
- Genus: Gnathium
- Species: G. francilloni

Binomial name
- Gnathium francilloni Kirby, 1818

Species of beetle

Gnathium francilloni is a species of blister beetle in the family Meloidae. It is found in North America.
