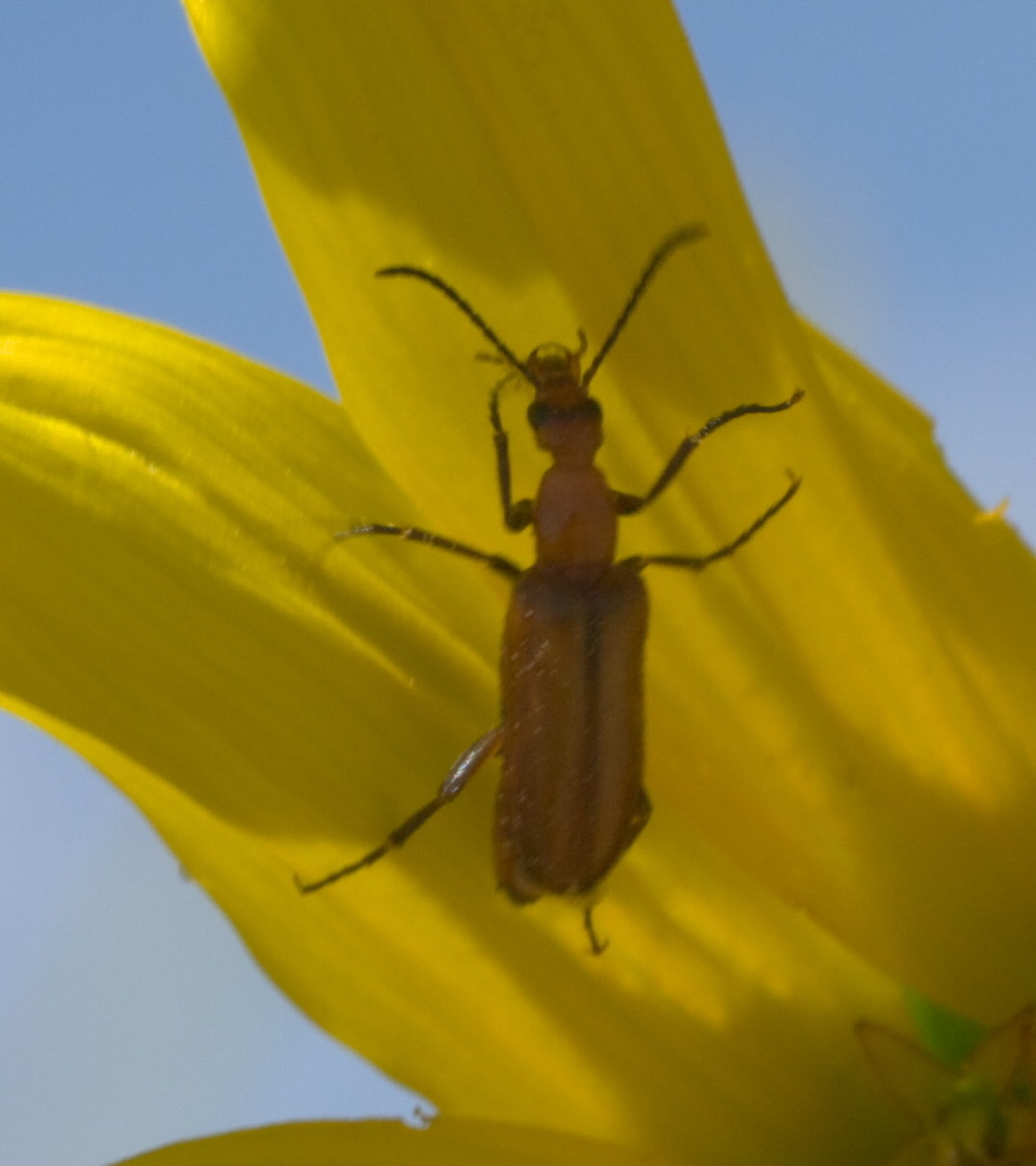
- Gnathium minimum

Scientific classification
- Domain: Eukaryota
- Kingdom: Animalia
- Phylum: Arthropoda
- Class: Insecta
- Order: Coleoptera
- Suborder: Polyphaga
- Infraorder: Cucujiformia
- Family: Meloidae
- Subfamily: Nemognathinae
- Tribe: Nemognathini
- Genus: Gnathium; Kirby, 1818

= Gnathium =

Genus of beetles

Gnathium is a genus of blister beetles in the family Meloidae. There are about 16 described species in Gnathium.

== Species ==
These 16 species belong to the genus Gnathium:

- Gnathium aetatis Scudder, 1900
- Gnathium californicum (Wickham, 1905)
- Gnathium caviceps MacSwain, 1952
- Gnathium eremicola MacSwain, 1952
- Gnathium francilloni Kirby, 1818
- Gnathium kanei Pinto, 2009
- Gnathium longicolle LeConte, 1858
- Gnathium martini MacSwain, 1952
- Gnathium minimum (Say, 1823)
- Gnathium murrayorum Pinto, 2009
- Gnathium nannulum MacSwain, 1952
- Gnathium nitidum Horn, 1870
- Gnathium obscurum MacSwain, 1952
- Gnathium politum Dillon, 1952
- Gnathium texanum Horn, 1870
- Gnathium vandykei MacSwain, 1952
