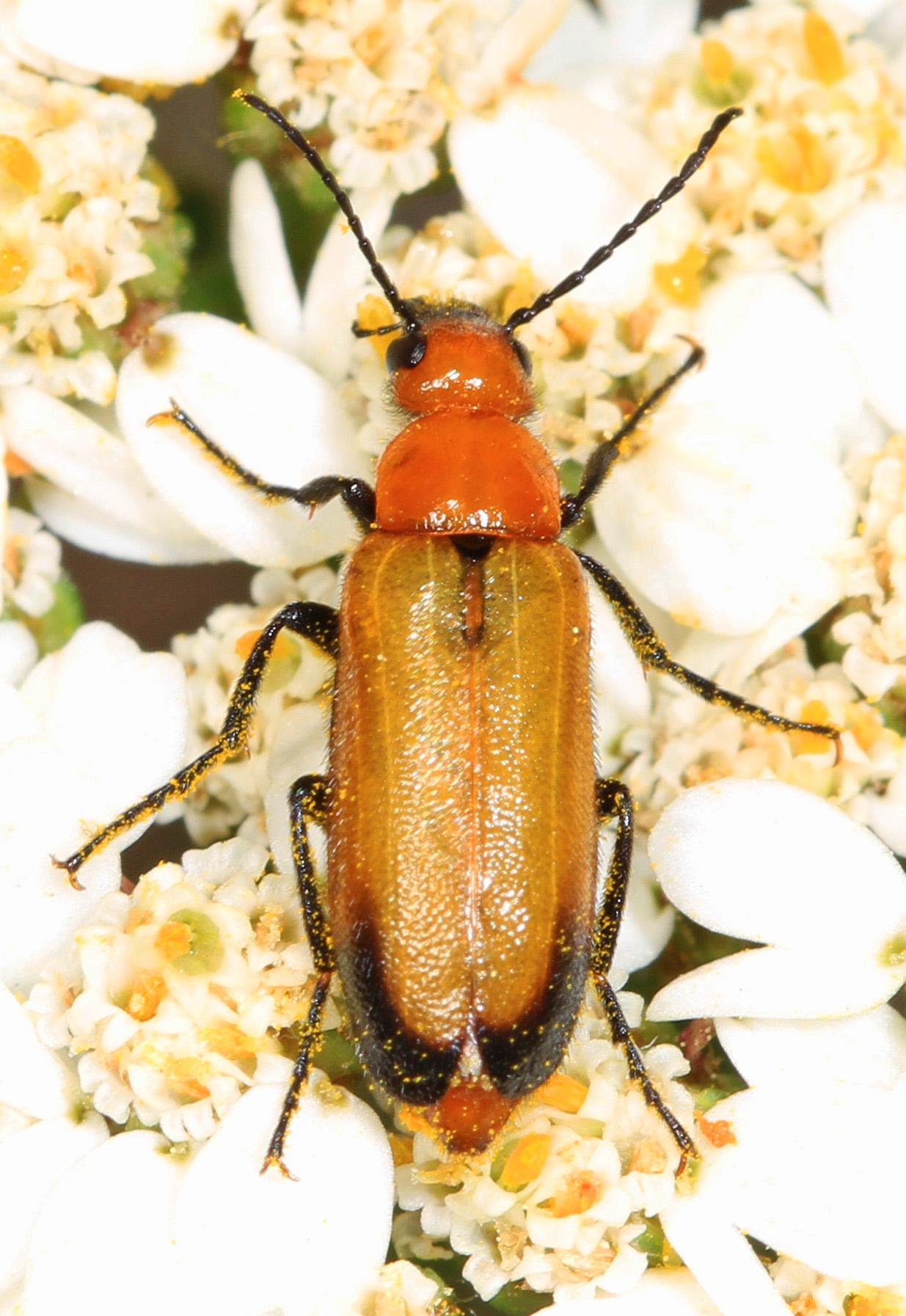

Scientific classification
- Kingdom: Animalia
- Phylum: Arthropoda
- Clade: Pancrustacea
- Class: Insecta
- Order: Coleoptera
- Suborder: Polyphaga
- Infraorder: Cucujiformia
- Family: Meloidae
- Genus: Nemognatha
- Species: N. cribraria

Binomial name
- Nemognatha cribraria LeConte, 1853

= Nemognatha cribraria =

Species of beetle

Nemognatha cribraria is a species of blister beetle in the family Meloidae. It is found in North America.

== Subspecies ==
These two subspecies belong to the species Nemognatha cribraria:

- Nemognatha cribraria cribraria LeConte, 1853
- Nemognatha cribraria fuscula Enns, 1956
