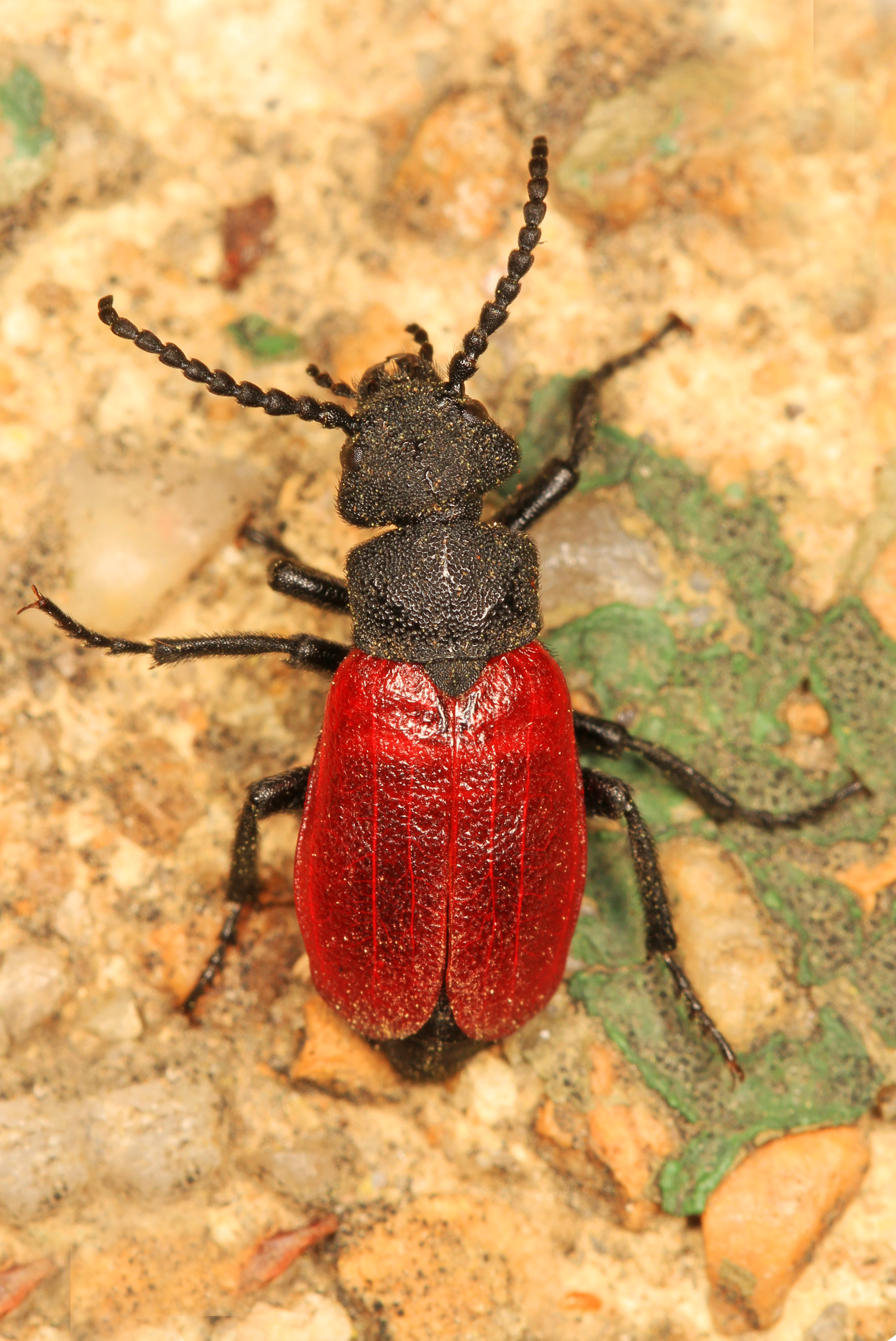

Scientific classification
- Domain: Eukaryota
- Kingdom: Animalia
- Phylum: Arthropoda
- Class: Insecta
- Order: Coleoptera
- Suborder: Polyphaga
- Infraorder: Cucujiformia
- Family: Meloidae
- Genus: Tricrania
- Species: T. sanguinipennis

Binomial name
- Tricrania sanguinipennis (Say, 1823)

= Tricrania sanguinipennis =

Species of beetle

Tricrania sanguinipennis is a species of blister beetle in the family Meloidae. It is found in North America.
