= Synhoria =

- Synhoria maxillosa from Java

Scientific classification
- Kingdom: Animalia
- Phylum: Arthropoda
- Clade: Pancrustacea
- Class: Insecta
- Order: Coleoptera
- Suborder: Polyphaga
- Infraorder: Cucujiformia
- Family: Meloidae
- Subfamily: Nemognathinae
- Tribe: Horiini
- Genus: Synhoria; Kolbe, 1897

Synonyms
- Sinhoria Pic, 1913

Genus of beetles

Synhoria is a genus of oil or blister beetles (Coleoptera: Meloidae) in the tribe Horiini; it was erected by Hermann Julius Kolbe in 1897. Species have been recorded from Sub-Saharan Africa, China, Japan, Indochina and Malesia.

== Species ==
As of November 2026, Biolib includes:

1. Synhoria anguliceps (Fairmaire, 1885)
2. Synhoria betsimisaraka Paulian, 1956
3. Synhoria cephalotes (Olivier, 1793) - type species (by subsequent designation)
4. Synhoria crouzeti Fairmaire, 1894
5. Synhoria fischeri Kolbe, 1897
6. Synhoria hottentota (Péringuey, 1888)
7. Synhoria macrognatha (Fairmaire, 1887)
8. Synhoria maxillosa (Fabricius, 1801)
9. Synhoria rhodesiana Péringuey, 1909
10. Synhoria senegalensis (Laporte de Castelnau, 1840)
11. Synhoria testacea (Fabricius, 1781)
