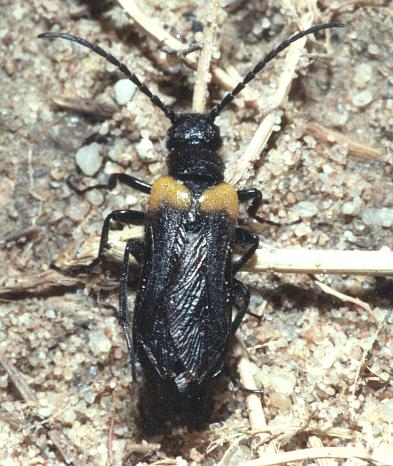
- Sitaris muralis

Scientific classification
- Kingdom: Animalia
- Phylum: Arthropoda
- Class: Insecta
- Order: Coleoptera
- Suborder: Polyphaga
- Infraorder: Cucujiformia
- Family: Meloidae
- Genus: Sitaris; Latreille, 1802

= Sitaris =

Genus of beetles

Sitaris is a genus of beetles belonging to the family Meloidae.

The species of this genus are found in Europe and Mediterranean.

Species:

- Sitaris emiliae Escherich, 1897
- Sitaris melanurus Kuster, 1849
- Sitaris muralis (Forster, 1771)
- Sitaris rufipennis Kuster, 1849
- Sitaris rufiventris Kraatz, 1884
- Sitaris solieri Pecchioli, 1839
- Sitaris tauricus Motschulsky, 1873
