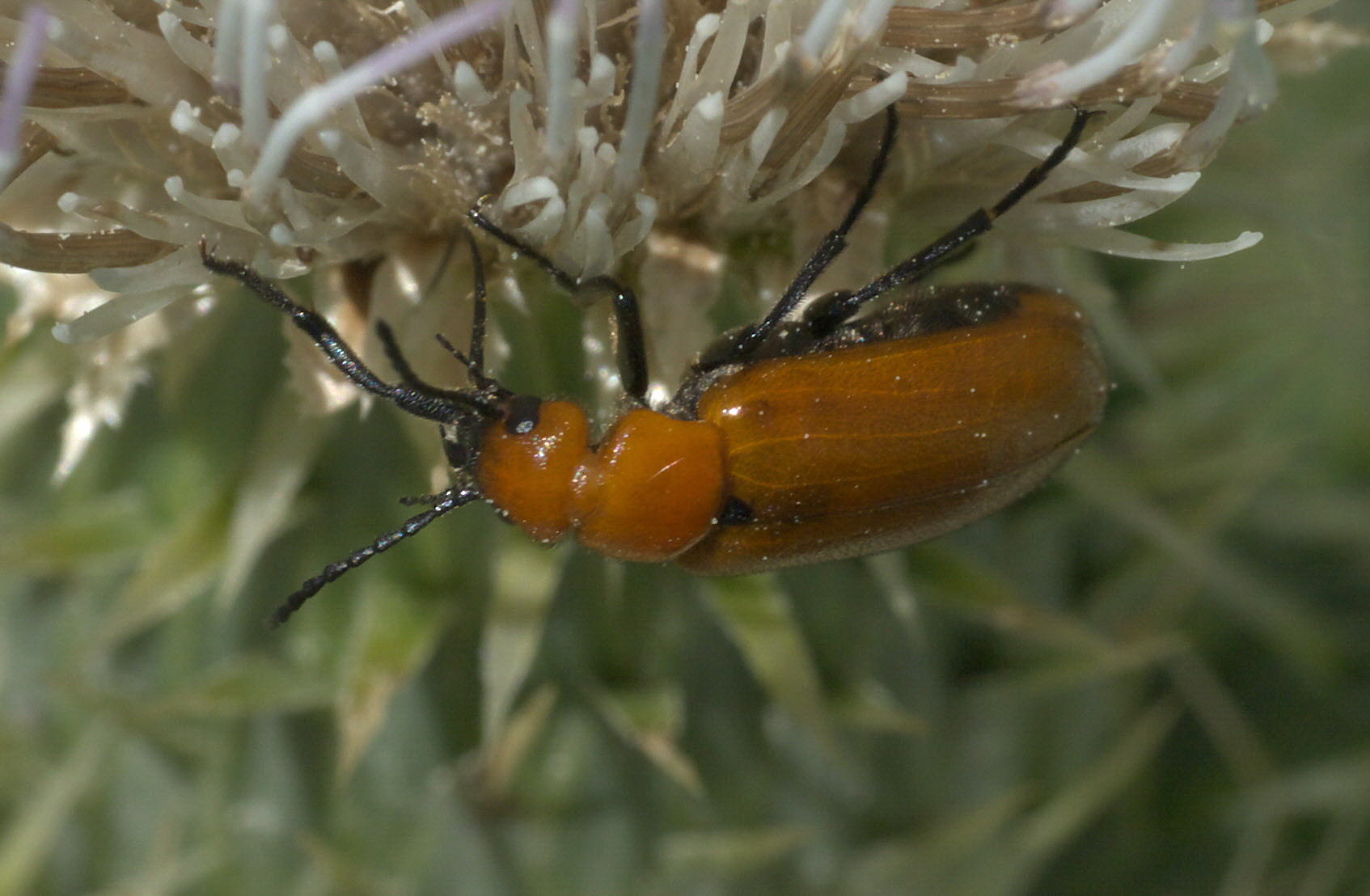
- Nemognatha lutea

Scientific classification
- Domain: Eukaryota
- Kingdom: Animalia
- Phylum: Arthropoda
- Class: Insecta
- Order: Coleoptera
- Suborder: Polyphaga
- Infraorder: Cucujiformia
- Family: Meloidae
- Tribe: Nemognathini
- Genus: Nemognatha; Illiger, 1807

= Nemognatha =

Genus of beetles

Nemognatha is a genus of blister beetles in the family Meloidae. There are at least 20 described species in Nemognatha.

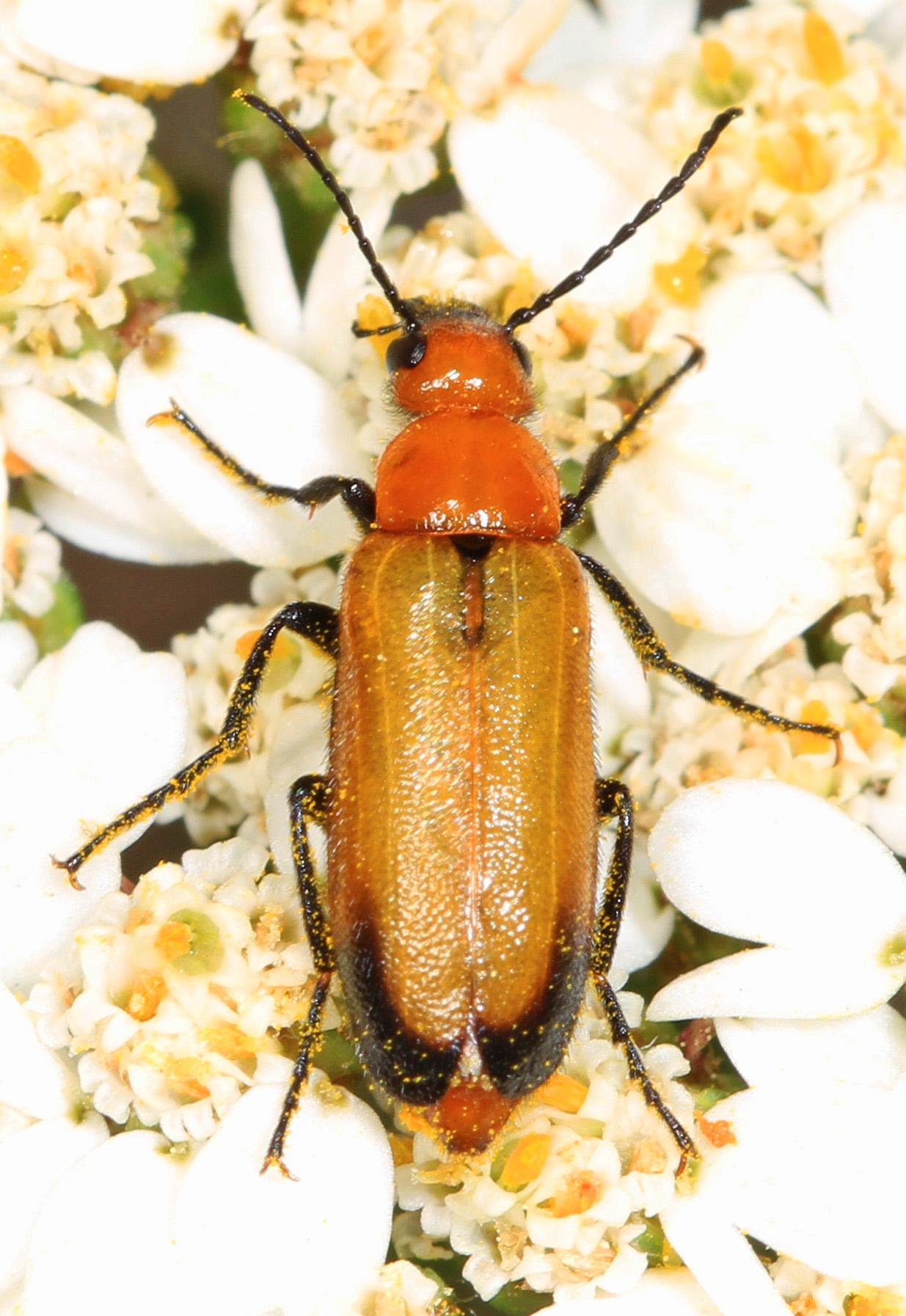
Nemognatha cribraria

== Species ==
- Nemognatha angusta Enns, 1956
- Nemognatha bifoveata Enns, 1956
- Nemognatha brevirostris Enns, 1956
- Nemognatha bridwelli Wellman, 1912
- Nemognatha cantharidis MacSwain, 1951
- Nemognatha capillaris Enns, 1956
- Nemognatha cribraria LeConte, 1853
- Nemognatha curta Enns, 1956
- Nemognatha explanata Enns, 1956
- Nemognatha hurdi MacSwain, 1951
- Nemognatha lurida (LeConte, 1853)
- Nemognatha lutea LeConte, 1853
- Nemognatha macswaini Enns, 1956
- Nemognatha meropa Enns, 1956
- Nemognatha miranda Enns, 1956
- Nemognatha nebrascensis Enns, 1956
- Nemognatha nemorensis Hentz, 1830
- Nemognatha nigripennis LeConte, 1853
- Nemognatha nitidula Enns, 1956
- Nemognatha pallens LeConte, 1853
- Nemognatha piazata (Fabricius, 1798)
- Nemognatha punctulata LeConte, 1853
- Nemognatha scutellaris LeConte, 1853
- Nemognatha selanderi Enns, 1956
- Nemognatha soror MacSwain, 1951
- Nemognatha sparsa LeConte, 1868
- Nemognatha werneri Enns, 1956
