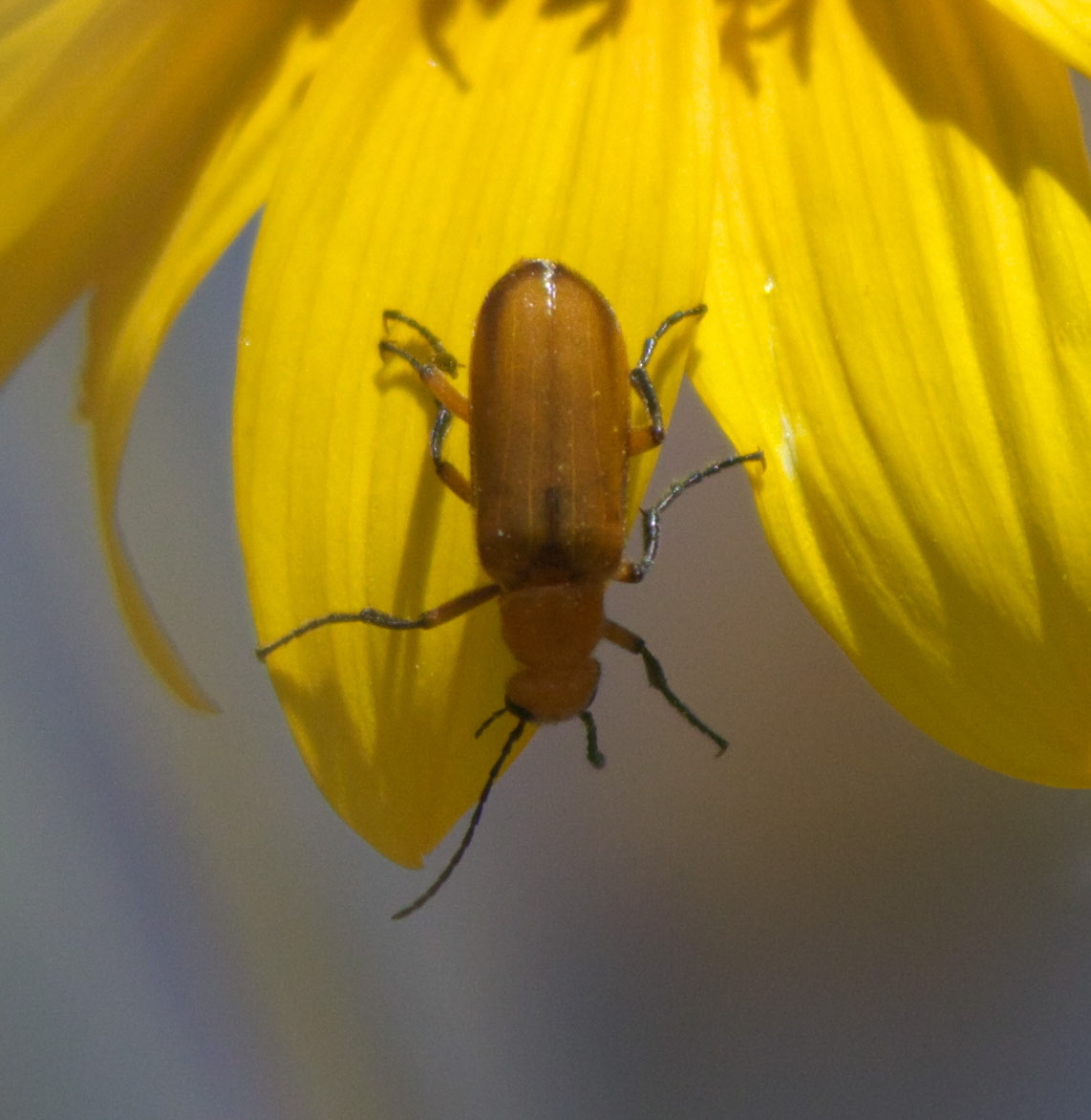

Scientific classification
- Kingdom: Animalia
- Phylum: Arthropoda
- Clade: Pancrustacea
- Class: Insecta
- Order: Coleoptera
- Suborder: Polyphaga
- Infraorder: Cucujiformia
- Family: Meloidae
- Subfamily: Nemognathinae; Laporte, 1840

Tribes
- Horiini Latreille, 1802; Nemognathini Laporte, 1840

= Nemognathinae =

Subfamily of beetles

Nemognathinae is a subfamily of blister beetles in the family Meloidae. There are at least 120 described species in Nemognathinae.

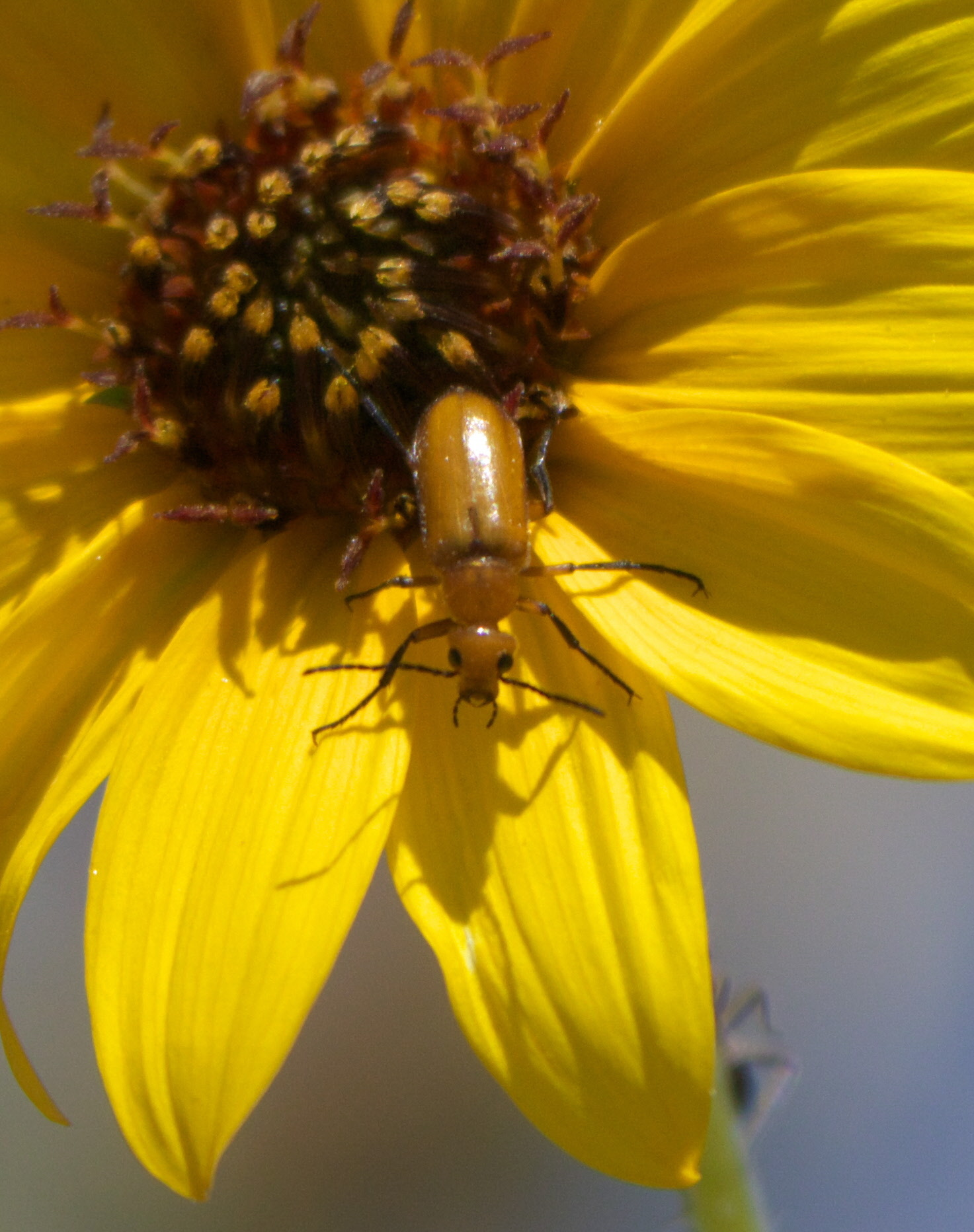

== Tribes and genera ==
The subfamily Nemognathinae consists of two tribes:

=== Horiini ===
Authority: Latreille, 1802

1. Cissites Latreille, 1804
2. Horia Fabricius, 1787
3. Synhoria Kolbe, 1897

=== Nemognathini ===
Authority: Laporte, 1840; sometimes subdivided into 3 subtribes: genera:

1. Apalus Fabricius, 1775
2. Cochliophorus Escherich, 1891
3. Ctenopus Fischer von Waldheim, 1824
4. Euzonitis Semenov, 1893
5. Gnathium Kirby, 1818
6. Hornia Riley, 1877
7. Leptopalpus Guerin de Meneville, 1844
8. Megatrachelus Motschulsky, 1845
9. Nemognatha Illiger, 1807
10. Pseudozonitis Dillon, 1952
11. Sitaris Latreille, 1802
12. Sitarobrachys Reitter, 1883
13. Stenodera Eschscholtz, 1818
14. Stenoria Mulsant, 1857
15. Tricrania LeConte, 1860
16. Zonitis Fabricius, 1775
17. Zonitodema Péringuey, 1909
18. Zonitomorpha Péringuey, 1909
19. Zonitoschema Péringuey, 1909

unplaced

- Rhyphonemognatha Enns, 1956
