= Phodaga marmorata =

Scientific classification
- Kingdom: Animalia
- Phylum: Arthropoda
- Class: Insecta
- Order: Coleoptera
- Suborder: Polyphaga
- Infraorder: Cucujiformia
- Family: Meloidae
- Subfamily: Meloinae
- Tribe: Eupomphini
- Genus: Phodaga
- Species: P. marmorata

Binomial name
- Phodaga marmorata (Casey, 1891)

Species of beetle

Phodaga marmorata is a species of blister beetle in the family Meloidae. It is found in Central America and North America.
