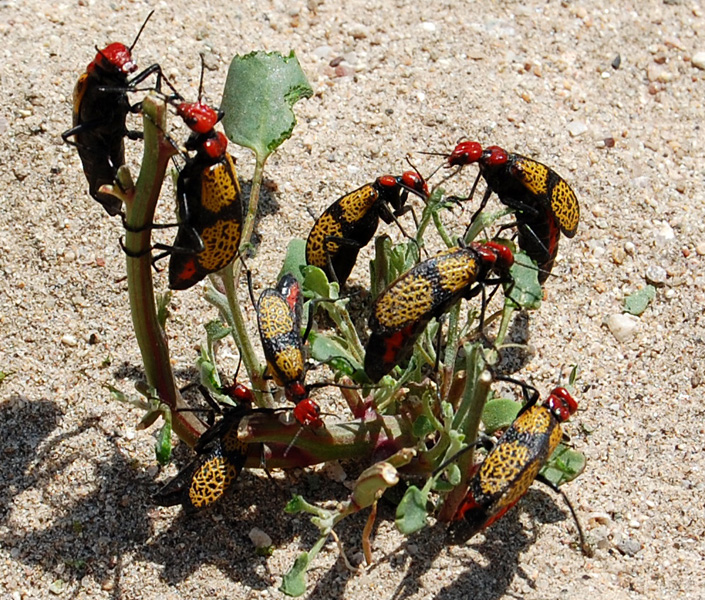

Scientific classification
- Kingdom: Animalia
- Phylum: Arthropoda
- Class: Insecta
- Order: Coleoptera
- Suborder: Polyphaga
- Infraorder: Cucujiformia
- Family: Meloidae
- Subfamily: Meloinae
- Tribe: Eupomphini
- Genus: Tegrodera
- Species: T. aloga

Binomial name
- Tegrodera aloga Skinner, 1903

Synonyms
- Tegrodera erosa aloga Skinner, 1903

= Tegrodera aloga =

Species of beetle

Tegrodera aloga, the iron cross blister beetle, is a species of blister beetle in the family Meloidae. It is found in Arizona, California, and Sonora.

The common name refers to the black cross on the wing covers. The scientific name T. aloga was coined by Skinner in 1903.

== Description ==
Tegrodera aloga is generally about 2 cm long; it has a long, narrow and cylindrical body and a wide head. The beetle is easily recognizable due to its contrasting yellow and red spots found on its black body. The brightness of the spots warns of the cantharidin toxins the beetle carries; this coloration is known as aposematism, and it works as a warning signal to protect itself from predators. It is more common to find these beetles in larger groups rather than individually.

== Behavior ==
In Tegrodera aloga, the males fight among themselves for the ability to mate with a female. Mating takes place actively, with the male on the female's back. Together they climb among flowers and leaves. The adults feed on spring blossoms of Nama hispida and Eriastrum, alfalfa, and other desert plants. They will drink nectar as well. The hosts of the parasitic larvae are unknown, but assumed to be ground-nesting bees.

== Relationship to humans and livestock ==
In Tegrodera aloga, cantharidin is excreted through the leg joints and the antennal pores. It is toxic to humans and can inflict painful and sometimes fatal injury to certain livestock. This chemical, C_{10}H_{12}O_{4}, causes severe skin blisters (dermatosis) within hours after exposure. The insect secretes this substance as a defense mechanism. Crushing the beetle also releases the cantharidin.

Cantharidin is a poisonous substance which can prove fatal if ingested. The lethal dose for humans when ingested is 10 mg, or 0.5 mg/kg of a human's body weight. The main concern revolves around when the beetle is ingested by livestock, in particular horses. The lethal dose for horses is 1 mg/kg. Iron cross blister beetles are known to be found in horses’ food, especially alfalfa. These beetles are starting to pose a problem for farmers in California due to them being “killed during harvest and incorporated into baled hay, or indirectly by transfer of the hemolymph from crushed beetles onto forage.”

This beetle is also considered beneficial because cantharidin is used in the medical field as a topical medication in the removal of warts, removal of tattoos, and has even been looked into for certain cancer treatments. Its use in the treatment of removing warts has been common for many years, and is still used by dermatologists.
