= Phodaga alticeps =

Scientific classification
- Domain: Eukaryota
- Kingdom: Animalia
- Phylum: Arthropoda
- Class: Insecta
- Order: Coleoptera
- Suborder: Polyphaga
- Infraorder: Cucujiformia
- Family: Meloidae
- Subfamily: Meloinae
- Tribe: Eupomphini
- Genus: Phodaga
- Species: P. alticeps

Binomial name
- Phodaga alticeps LeConte, 1858

Species of beetle

Phodaga alticeps is a species of blister beetle in the family Meloidae. It is found in North America.
