= Pleuropasta mirabilis =

Scientific classification
- Domain: Eukaryota
- Kingdom: Animalia
- Phylum: Arthropoda
- Class: Insecta
- Order: Coleoptera
- Suborder: Polyphaga
- Infraorder: Cucujiformia
- Family: Meloidae
- Tribe: Eupomphini
- Genus: Pleuropasta
- Species: P. mirabilis

Binomial name
- Pleuropasta mirabilis (Horn, 1870)

Species of beetle

Pleuropasta mirabilis is a species of blister beetle in the family Meloidae. It is found in Central America and North America.
