= Megetra cancellata =

Scientific classification
- Kingdom: Animalia
- Phylum: Arthropoda
- Class: Insecta
- Order: Coleoptera
- Suborder: Polyphaga
- Infraorder: Cucujiformia
- Family: Meloidae
- Tribe: Eupomphini
- Genus: Megetra
- Species: M. cancellata

Binomial name
- Megetra cancellata (Brandt & Erichson, 1832)

Species of beetle

Megetra cancellata is a species of blister beetle in the family Meloidae. It is found in Central America and North America.

== Subspecies ==
These two subspecies belong to the species Megetra cancellata:

- Megetra cancellata cancellata
- Megetra cancellata hoegei Duges, 1889
