= Eupompha wenzeli =

Scientific classification
- Domain: Eukaryota
- Kingdom: Animalia
- Phylum: Arthropoda
- Class: Insecta
- Order: Coleoptera
- Suborder: Polyphaga
- Infraorder: Cucujiformia
- Family: Meloidae
- Tribe: Eupomphini
- Genus: Eupompha
- Species: E. wenzeli

Binomial name
- Eupompha wenzeli Skinner, 1904

Species of beetle

Eupompha wenzeli is a species of blister beetle in the family Meloidae. It is found in Central America and North America.
