= Megetra punctata =

Scientific classification
- Domain: Eukaryota
- Kingdom: Animalia
- Phylum: Arthropoda
- Class: Insecta
- Order: Coleoptera
- Suborder: Polyphaga
- Infraorder: Cucujiformia
- Family: Meloidae
- Tribe: Eupomphini
- Genus: Megetra
- Species: M. punctata

Binomial name
- Megetra punctata Selander, 1965

Species of beetle

Megetra punctata is a species of blister beetle in the family Meloidae. It is found in Central America and North America.
