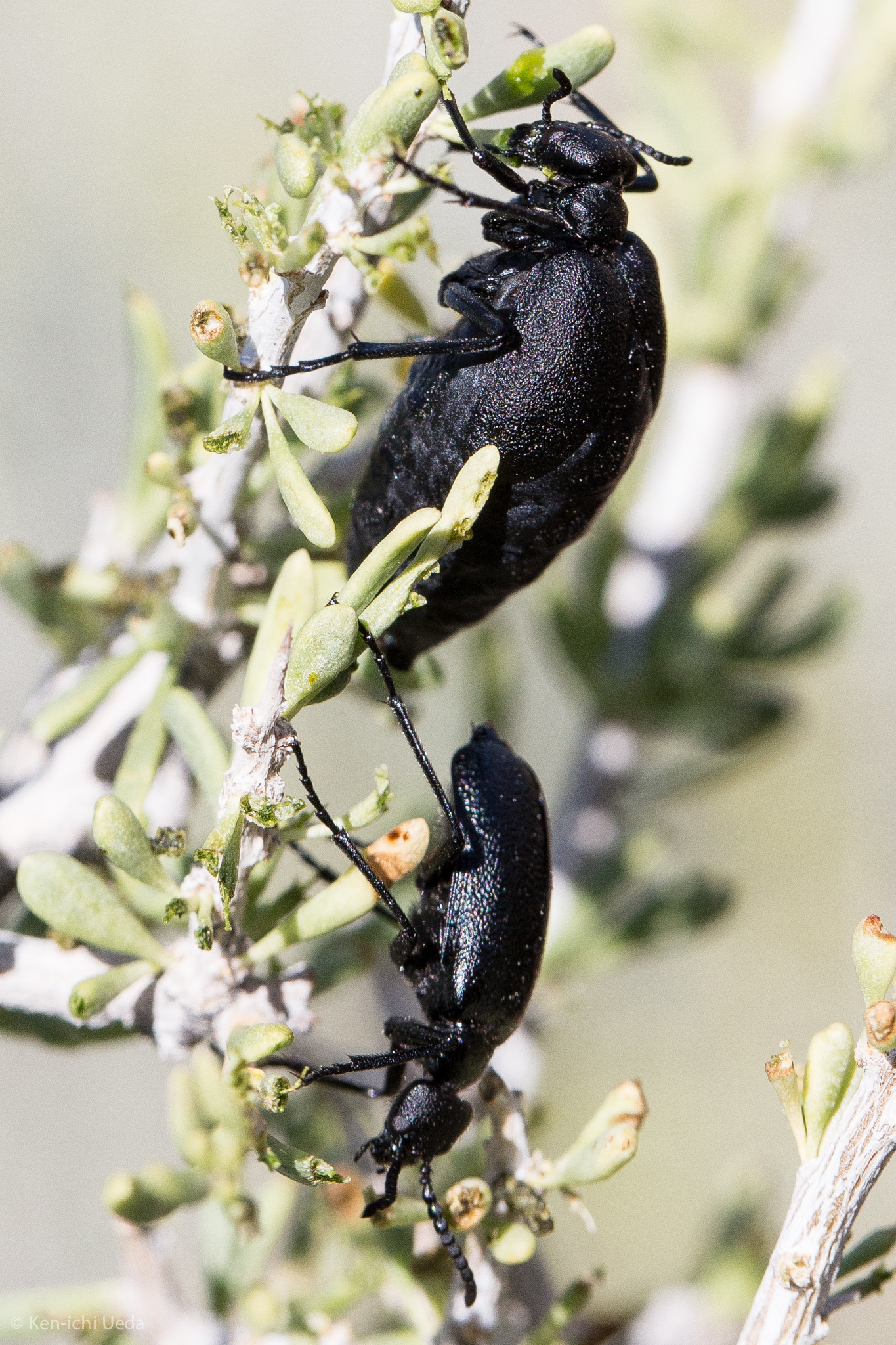
- Female (above) and male (below) individuals of C. opaca

Scientific classification
- Domain: Eukaryota
- Kingdom: Animalia
- Phylum: Arthropoda
- Class: Insecta
- Order: Coleoptera
- Suborder: Polyphaga
- Infraorder: Cucujiformia
- Family: Meloidae
- Genus: Cordylospasta
- Species: C. opaca

Binomial name
- Cordylospasta opaca (Horn, 1868)

= Cordylospasta opaca =

Species of beetle

Cordylospasta opaca is a blister beetle that occurs in arid regions central and southern California. Males are fully winged and reach a length of 12 mm, while females are flightless with reduced elytra and reach a length of 19 mm. Cordylospasta fulleri is almost identical, but occurs in the Great Basin and has 8-10 antennal segments, while Cordylospasta opaca should have 11 antennal segments.
