= Eupompha schwarzi =

Scientific classification
- Kingdom: Animalia
- Phylum: Arthropoda
- Class: Insecta
- Order: Coleoptera
- Suborder: Polyphaga
- Infraorder: Cucujiformia
- Family: Meloidae
- Tribe: Eupomphini
- Genus: Eupompha
- Species: E. schwarzi

Binomial name
- Eupompha schwarzi Wellman, 1909

Species of beetle

Eupompha schwarzi is a species of blister beetle in the family Meloidae. It is found in North America.
