= Eupompha histrionica =

Scientific classification
- Domain: Eukaryota
- Kingdom: Animalia
- Phylum: Arthropoda
- Class: Insecta
- Order: Coleoptera
- Suborder: Polyphaga
- Infraorder: Cucujiformia
- Family: Meloidae
- Tribe: Eupomphini
- Genus: Eupompha
- Species: E. histrionica

Binomial name
- Eupompha histrionica Horn, 1891

Species of beetle

Eupompha histrionica is a species of blister beetle in the family Meloidae. It is found in North America.
