= Eupompha edmundsi =

Scientific classification
- Domain: Eukaryota
- Kingdom: Animalia
- Phylum: Arthropoda
- Class: Insecta
- Order: Coleoptera
- Suborder: Polyphaga
- Infraorder: Cucujiformia
- Family: Meloidae
- Tribe: Eupomphini
- Genus: Eupompha
- Species: E. edmundsi

Binomial name
- Eupompha edmundsi Selander, 1953

Species of beetle

Eupompha edmundsi is a species of blister beetle in the family Meloidae. It is found in North America.
