= Megetra vittata =

Scientific classification
- Kingdom: Animalia
- Phylum: Arthropoda
- Clade: Pancrustacea
- Class: Insecta
- Order: Coleoptera
- Suborder: Polyphaga
- Infraorder: Cucujiformia
- Family: Meloidae
- Genus: Megetra
- Species: M. vittata

Binomial name
- Megetra vittata (LeConte, 1853)

Species of beetle

Megetra vittata is a species of blister beetle in the family Meloidae. It is found in North America. Like other blister beetles, It excretes cantharidin, a toxic chemical, to defend itself from predators. Animals such as horses can fall ill and die from this toxin, as a result of eating many of these beetles, as they have been reported to get mixed in with their hay and other feed.
