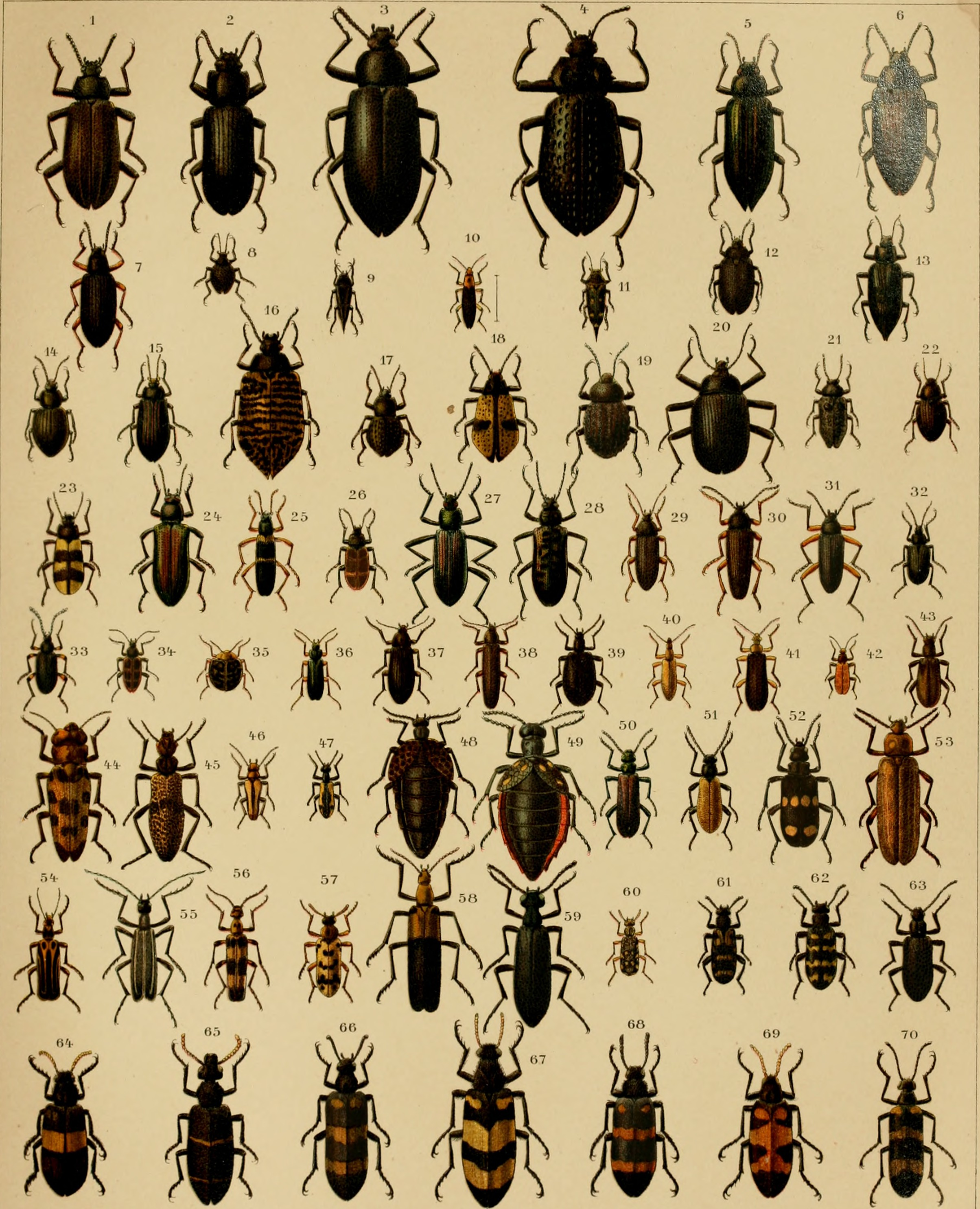

Scientific classification
- Domain: Eukaryota
- Kingdom: Animalia
- Phylum: Arthropoda
- Class: Insecta
- Order: Coleoptera
- Suborder: Polyphaga
- Infraorder: Cucujiformia
- Family: Meloidae
- Genus: Tegrodera
- Species: T. erosa

Binomial name
- Tegrodera erosa LeConte, 1851

= Tegrodera erosa =

Species of beetle

Tegrodera erosa is a species of blister beetle in the family Meloidae. It is found from California south to Sinaloa.

== Subspecies ==
These two subspecies belong to the species Tegrodera erosa:

- Tegrodera erosa erosa LeConte, 1851
- Tegrodera erosa inornata Blaisdell, 1918
