= Pleuropasta =

Scientific classification
- Domain: Eukaryota
- Kingdom: Animalia
- Phylum: Arthropoda
- Class: Insecta
- Order: Coleoptera
- Suborder: Polyphaga
- Infraorder: Cucujiformia
- Family: Meloidae
- Subfamily: Meloinae
- Tribe: Eupomphini
- Genus: Pleuropasta; Wellman, 1909

Genus of beetles

Pleuropasta is a genus of blister beetles in the family Meloidae. There are at least two described species in Pleuropasta.

== Species ==
These two species belong to the genus Pleuropasta:

- Pleuropasta mirabilis (Horn, 1870)
- Pleuropasta reticulata Van Dyke, 1947
