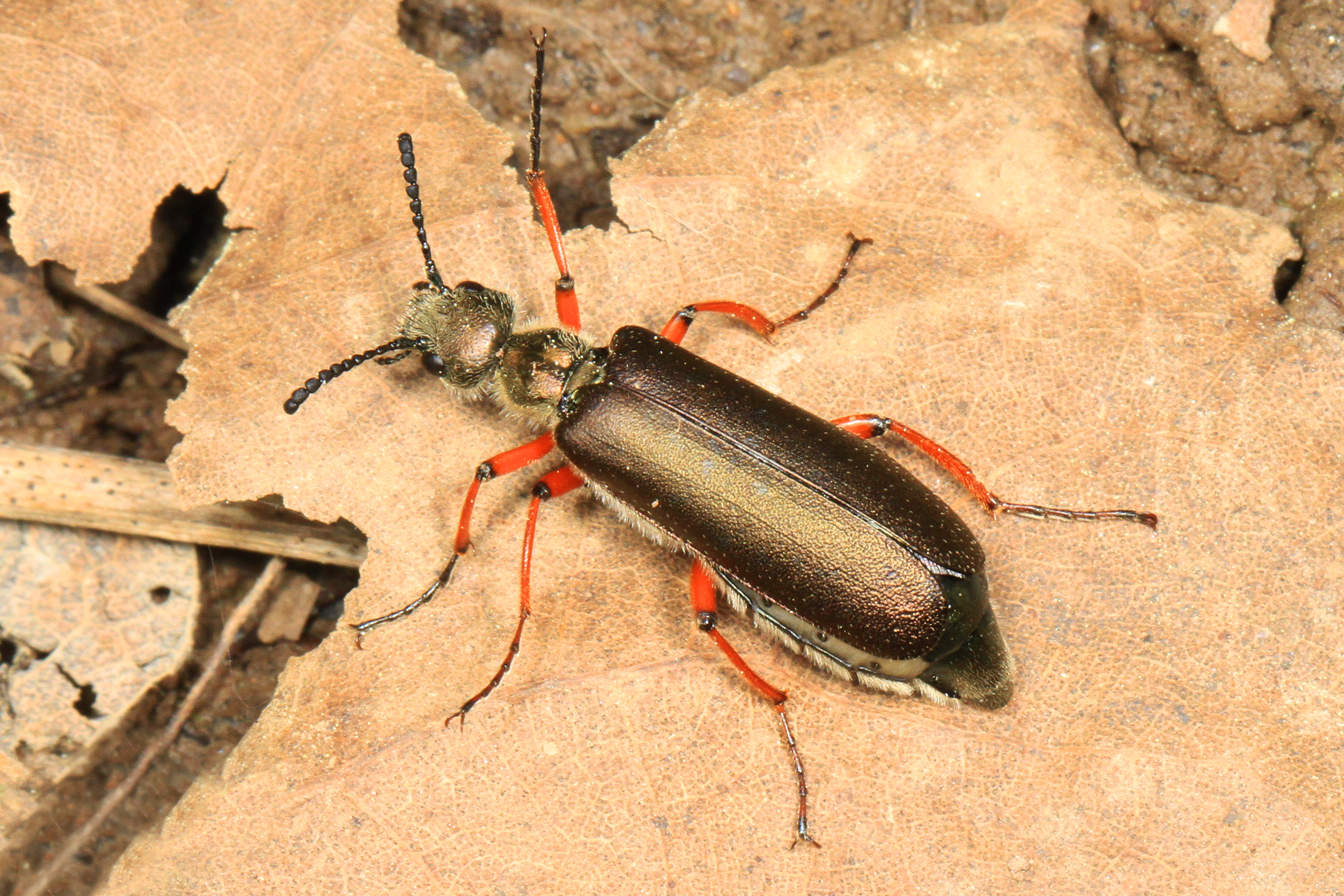
- Lytta aenea

Scientific classification
- Domain: Eukaryota
- Kingdom: Animalia
- Phylum: Arthropoda
- Class: Insecta
- Order: Coleoptera
- Suborder: Polyphaga
- Infraorder: Cucujiformia
- Family: Meloidae
- Subfamily: Meloinae
- Tribe: Lyttini
- Genus: Lytta; Fabricius, 1775

= Lytta =

Genus of beetles

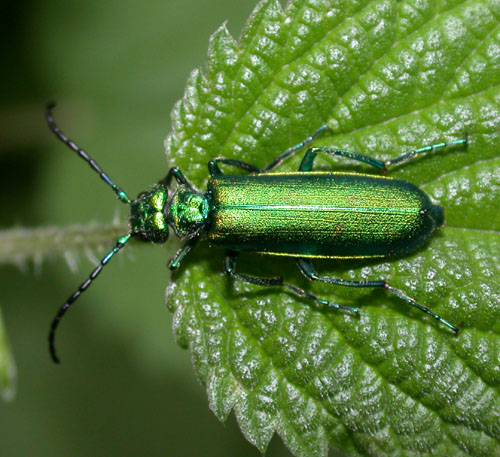
Lytta vesicatoria, the Spanish fly

Lytta is a genus of blister beetles in the family Meloidae. There are about 70 described species in North America, and over 100 species worldwide.

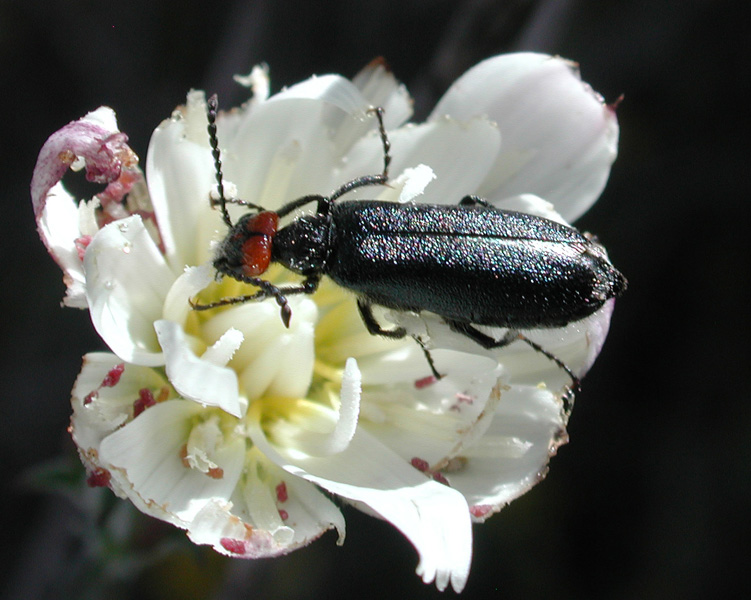
Lytta auriculata

== Selected species ==
These species, and others, belong to the genus Lytta:

- Lytta aenea Say, 1824
- Lytta aeneipennis (LeConte, 1851)
- Lytta agrestis (Fall, 1901)
- Lytta arizonica Selander, 1957
- Lytta augusti Haag-Rutenberg, 1880
- Lytta auriculata Horn, 1870 (red-eared blister beetle)
- Lytta battonii Kaszab, 1962
- Lytta biguttata LeConte, 1853
- Lytta bipuncticollis Haag-Rutenberg, 1880
- Lytta blaisdelli (Fall, 1909)
- Lytta boleti Marsham, 1802
- Lytta bruchi Pic, 1927
- Lytta canelas Selander, 1960
- Lytta cardinalis Chevrolat, 1834
- Lytta childi LeConte, 1857
- Lytta chloris (Fall, 1901)
- Lytta comans Selander, 1960
- Lytta corallifera Haag-Rutenberg, 1880
- Lytta cribrata LeConte, 1853
- Lytta crotchi (Horn, 1874)
- Lytta crotchii (Horn, 1874)
- Lytta cyanipennis (LeConte, 1851) (green blister beetle)
- Lytta deserticola Horn, 1870
- Lytta ebenina (Dugès, 1877)
- Lytta erebea (Champion, 1892)
- Lytta erythrothorax (Herrera & Mendoza, 1867)
- Lytta eucera (Chevrolat, 1834)
- Lytta flavicollis Gyllenhal, 1817
- Lytta fulvipennis LeConte, 1853
- Lytta funerea (Fall, 1901)
- Lytta hirsuta
- Lytta hoppingi Wellman, 1912
- Lytta icterica Gyllenhal, 1817
- Lytta insperata (Horn, 1874)
- Lytta koltzei Haag-Rutenberg, 1880
- Lytta lecontei Heyden, 1890
- Lytta lineola
- Lytta lugens (LeConte, 1851)
- Lytta lugubris (Horn, 1873)
- Lytta magister Horn, 1870 (master blister beetle)
- Lytta manicata J.Sahlberg, 1903
- Lytta margarita (Fall, 1901)
- Lytta medvedevi Shapovalov, 2016
- Lytta melaena LeConte, 1858
- Lytta melanurus (Hope, 1831)
- Lytta michoacanae (Champion, 1892)
- Lytta mirifica Werner, 1950 (Anthony blister beetle)
- Lytta moerens (LeConte, 1851)
- Lytta moesta (Horn, 1878)
- Lytta molesta (Horn, 1885)
- Lytta morosa (Fall, 1901)
- Lytta morrisoni (Horn, 1891) (Morrison's blister beetle)
- Lytta mutilata (Horn, 1875)
- Lytta navajo Werner, 1951
- Lytta nigripilis (Fall, 1901)
- Lytta nigrocyanea Van Dyke, 1929
- Lytta nitidicollis (LeConte, 1851)
- Lytta nuttalli Say, 1824 (Nuttall's blister beetle)
- Lytta peninsularis (Fall, 1901)
- Lytta plumbea Haag-Rutenberg, 1880
- Lytta polita Say, 1824 (bronze blister beetle)
- Lytta proteus Haag-Rutenberg, 1880
- Lytta puberula LeConte, 1866
- Lytta quadrimaculata (Chevrolat, 1834)
- Lytta rathvoni LeConte, 1853
- Lytta refulgens Horn, 1870
- Lytta regiszahiri Kaszab, 1958
- Lytta reticulata Say, 1824
- Lytta sanguinea Haag-Rutenberg, 1880
- Lytta sayi LeConte, 1853 (Say blister beetle)
- Lytta scitula (Champion, 1892)
- Lytta scituloides Selander, 1960
- Lytta skrylniki Shapovalov, 2016
- Lytta sonorae Van Dyke, 1947
- Lytta strigata Gyllenhal, 1817
- Lytta stygica (LeConte, 1851)
- Lytta sublaevis (Horn, 1868)
- Lytta tenebrosa (LeConte, 1851)
- Lytta unguicularis (LeConte, 1866)
- Lytta variabilis (Dugès, 1869)
- Lytta vesicatoria (Linnaeus, 1758)
- Lytta viridana LeConte, 1866
- Lytta vulnerata (LeConte, 1851)
- † Lytta aesculapii Heer, 1847
- † Lytta lithophila (Wickham, 1914)
