= Phodaga =

Scientific classification
- Kingdom: Animalia
- Phylum: Arthropoda
- Class: Insecta
- Order: Coleoptera
- Suborder: Polyphaga
- Infraorder: Cucujiformia
- Family: Meloidae
- Subfamily: Meloinae
- Tribe: Eupomphini
- Genus: Phodaga; LeConte, 1858

Genus of beetles

Phodaga is a genus of blister beetles in the family Meloidae. There are at least two described species in Phodaga.

== Species ==
These two species belong to the genus Phodaga:

- Phodaga alticeps LeConte, 1858
- Phodaga marmorata (Casey, 1891)
