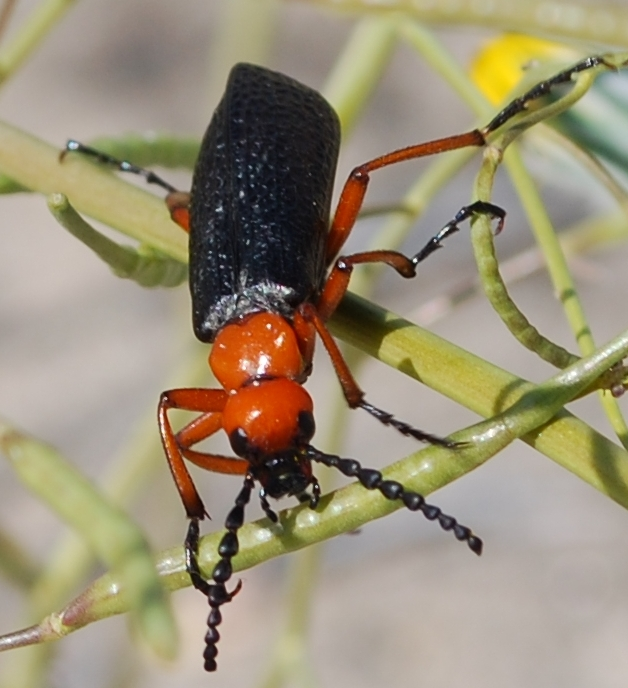

Scientific classification
- Domain: Eukaryota
- Kingdom: Animalia
- Phylum: Arthropoda
- Class: Insecta
- Order: Coleoptera
- Suborder: Polyphaga
- Infraorder: Cucujiformia
- Family: Meloidae
- Genus: Lytta
- Species: L. magister

Binomial name
- Lytta magister Horn, 1870

= Lytta magister =

Species of beetle

Lytta magister, the desert blister beetle or master blister beetle, is a species of blister beetle found in southwestern North America.

Typically 16 to 33 mm (0.6 to 1.3 in) in length, L. magister has a striking red head, legs and prothorax, with black elytra. They can be found in great numbers in the Mojave and Colorado Deserts in spring, and are often seen in swarms. Females lay eggs in holes in the desert soil. The larvae are insectivorous, mainly attacking bee nests. They consume the immature host along with its provisions, and can often survive on the provisions alone, thus they are not obligatory parasitoids but rather food parasites that are facultatively parasitoid, or simply predatory. Adults feed on flowers and leaves of brittlebush. Though they are not venomous, they can in fact bite.

== Gallery ==
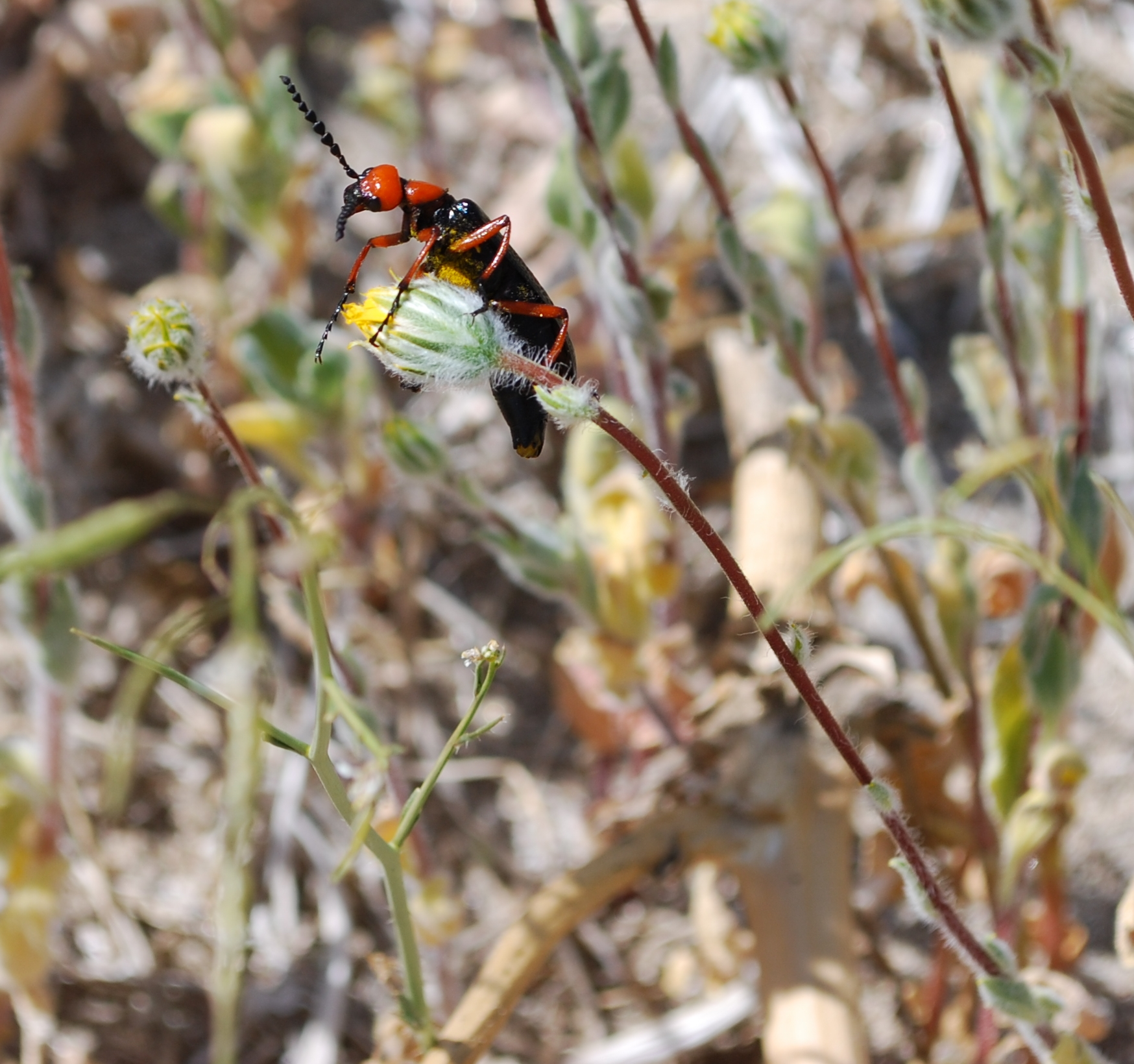
Lytta magister distributing pollen in Anza-Borrego Desert State Park, California

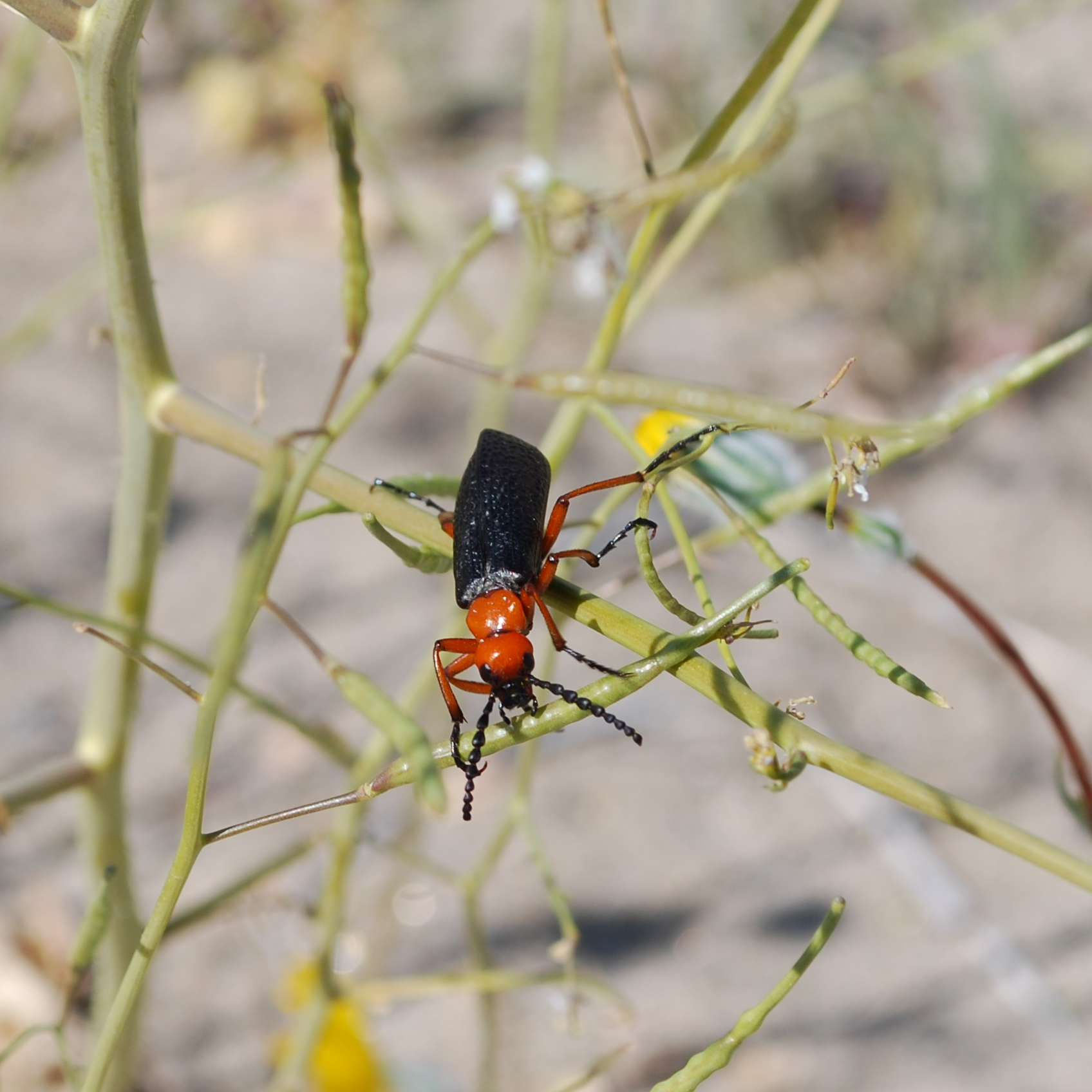
Lytta magister in Anza-Borrego Desert State Park

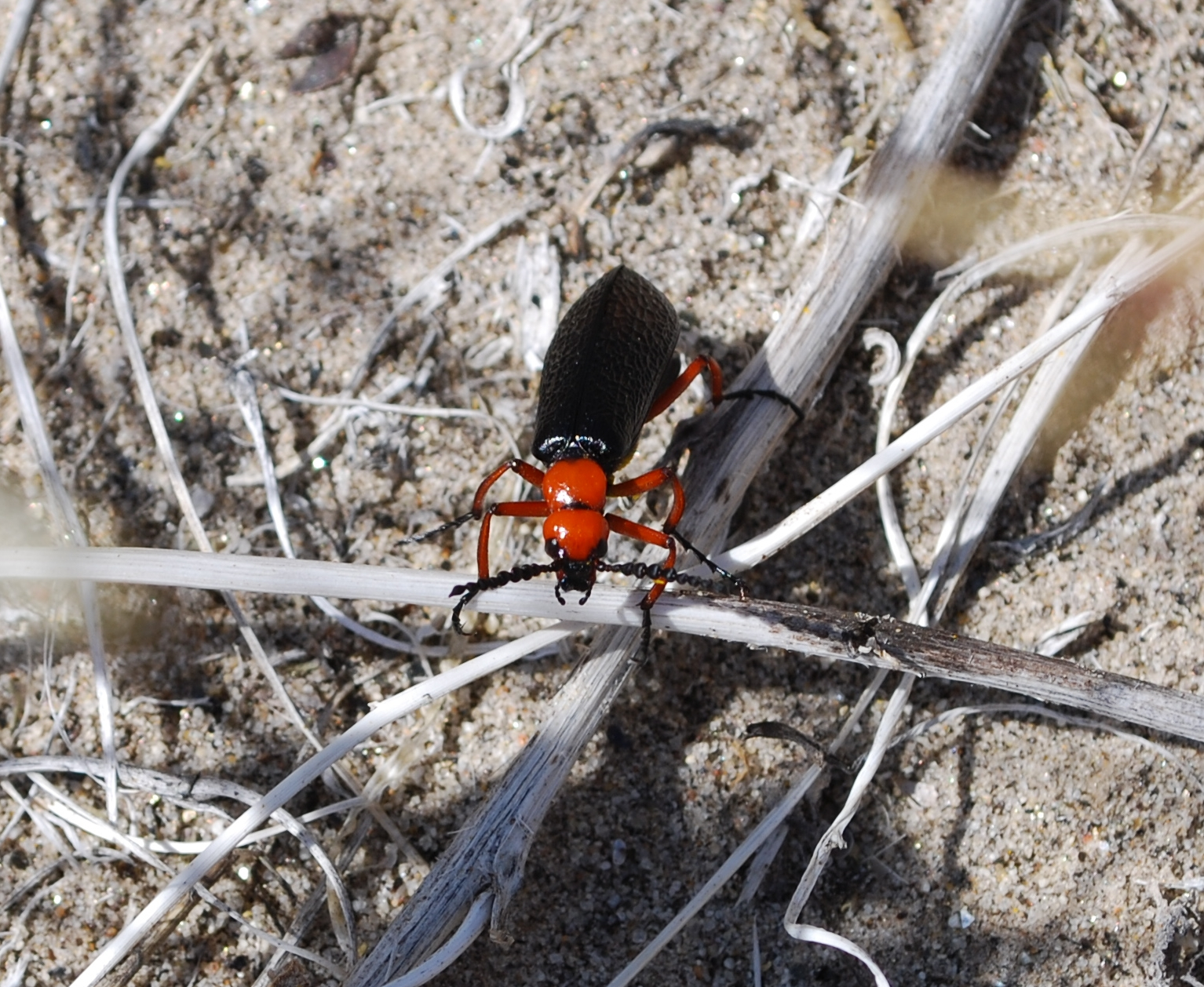
Lytta magister in Anza-Borrego Desert State Park

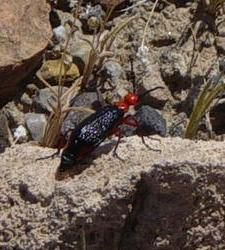
Lytta magister above Mesquite Springs in Death Valley National Park

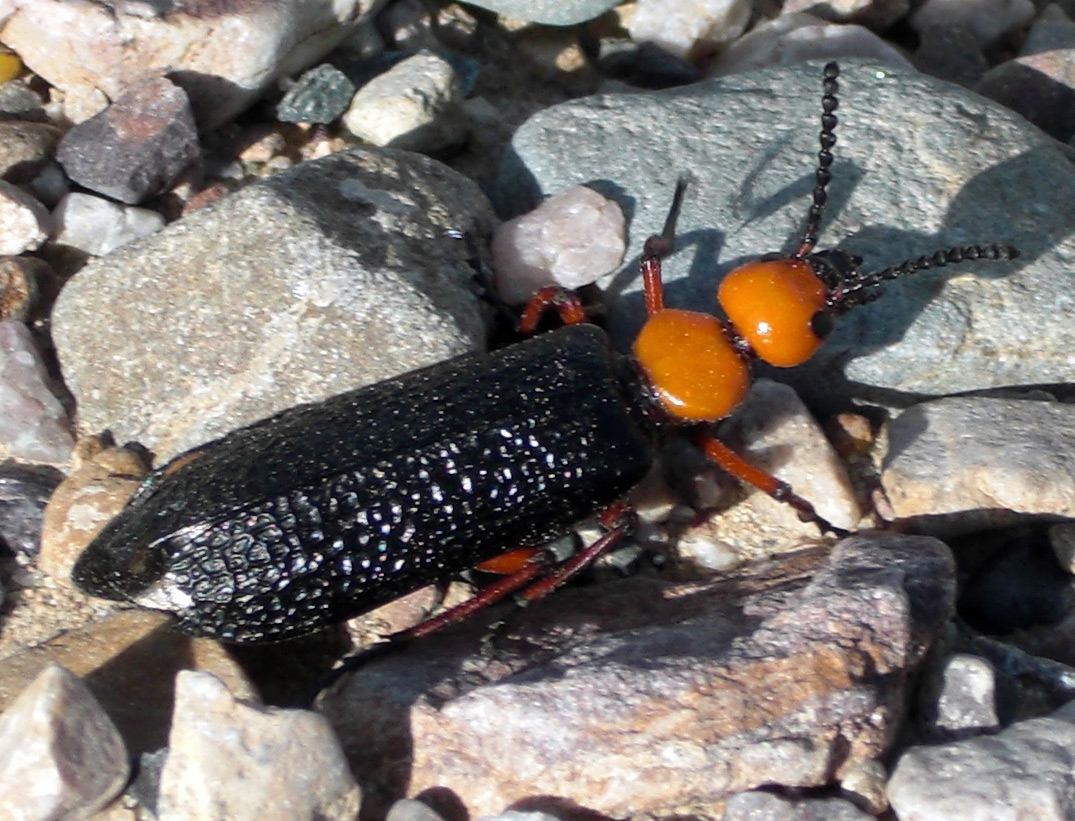
Lytta magister in Death Valley National Park
