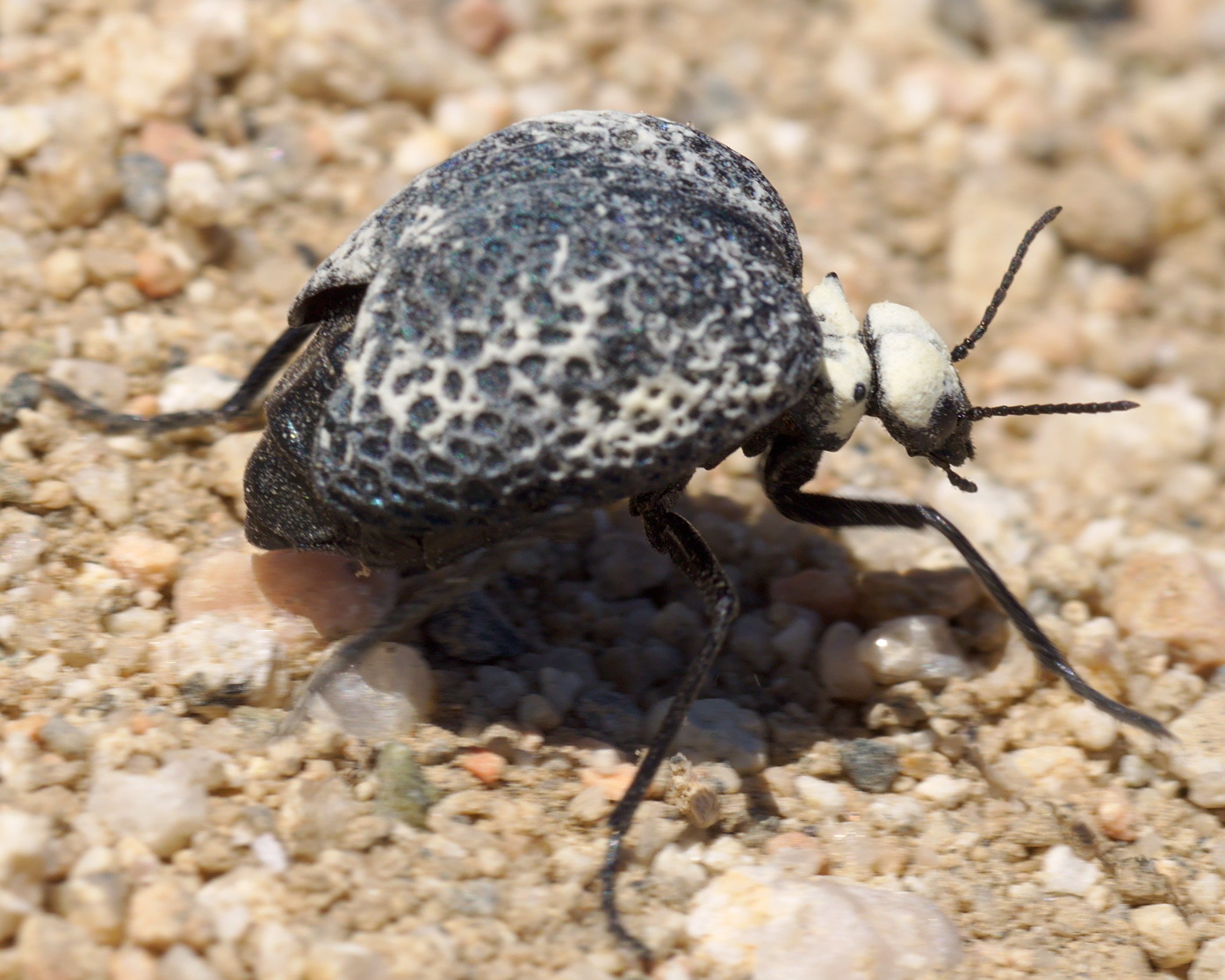

Scientific classification
- Domain: Eukaryota
- Kingdom: Animalia
- Phylum: Arthropoda
- Class: Insecta
- Order: Coleoptera
- Suborder: Polyphaga
- Infraorder: Cucujiformia
- Family: Meloidae
- Genus: Cysteodemus
- Species: C. armatus

Binomial name
- Cysteodemus armatus LeConte, 1851

= Cysteodemus armatus =

Species of beetle

Cysteodemus armatus, the inflated blister beetle, is a species of blister beetle in the family Meloidae. It is found in Central America and North America. The wing covers, which are mostly glabrous, are inflated to the point of almost covering part of the thorax. They are black, densely spotted with white. The elytra are fused along the middle, meaning that the beetle cannot fly.

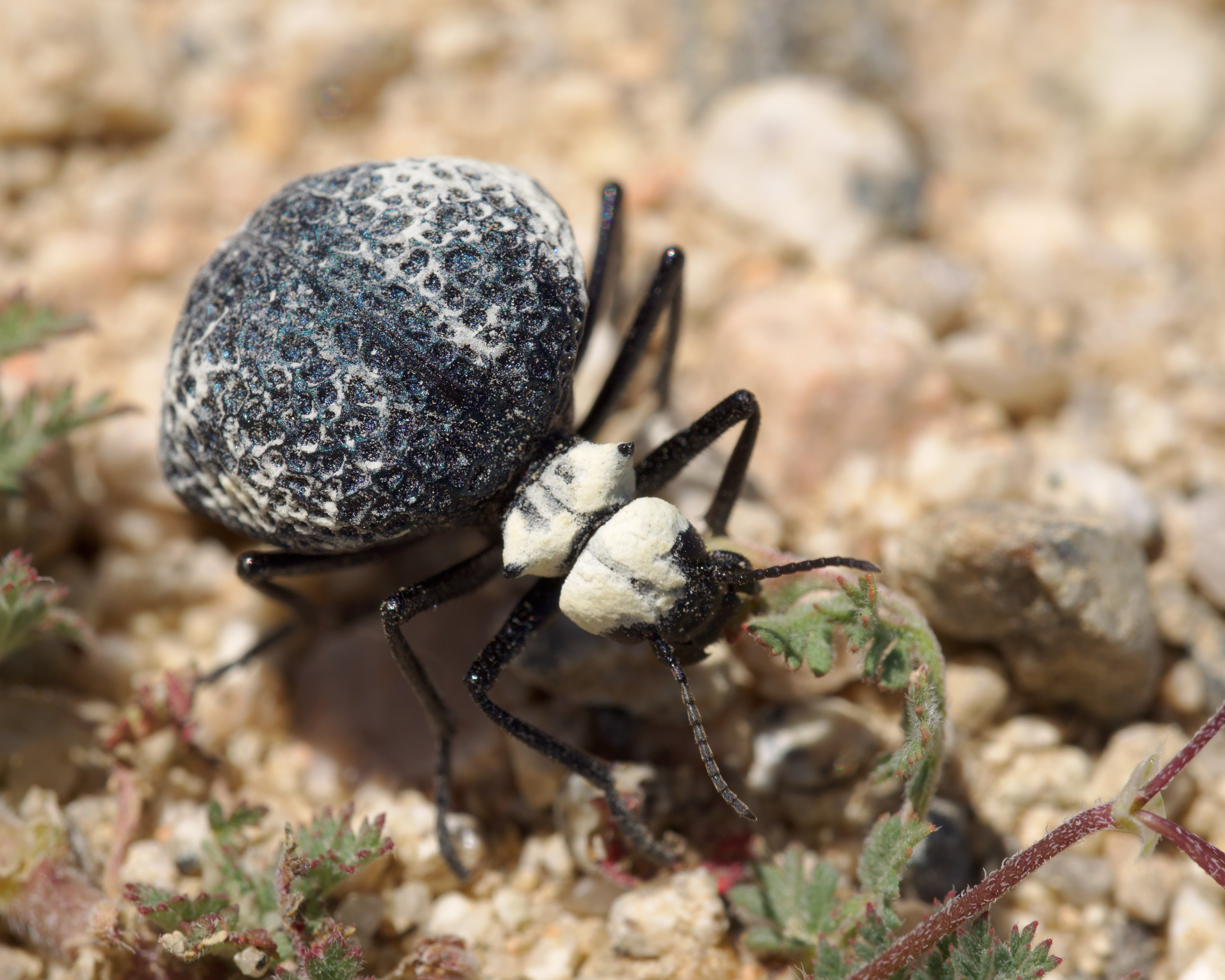
Inflated beetle, Cysteodemus armatus

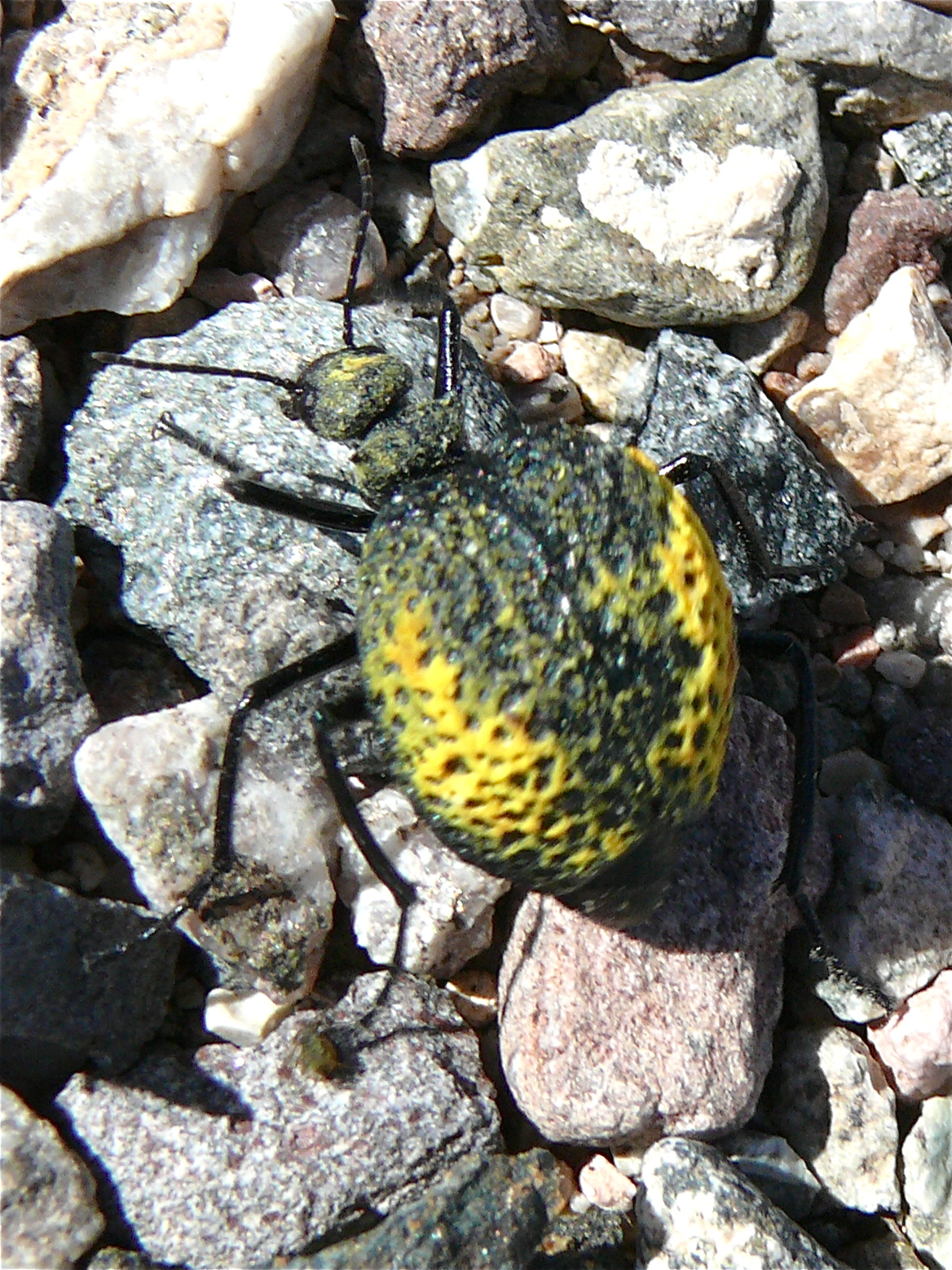
Inflated beetle, Cysteodemus armatus
