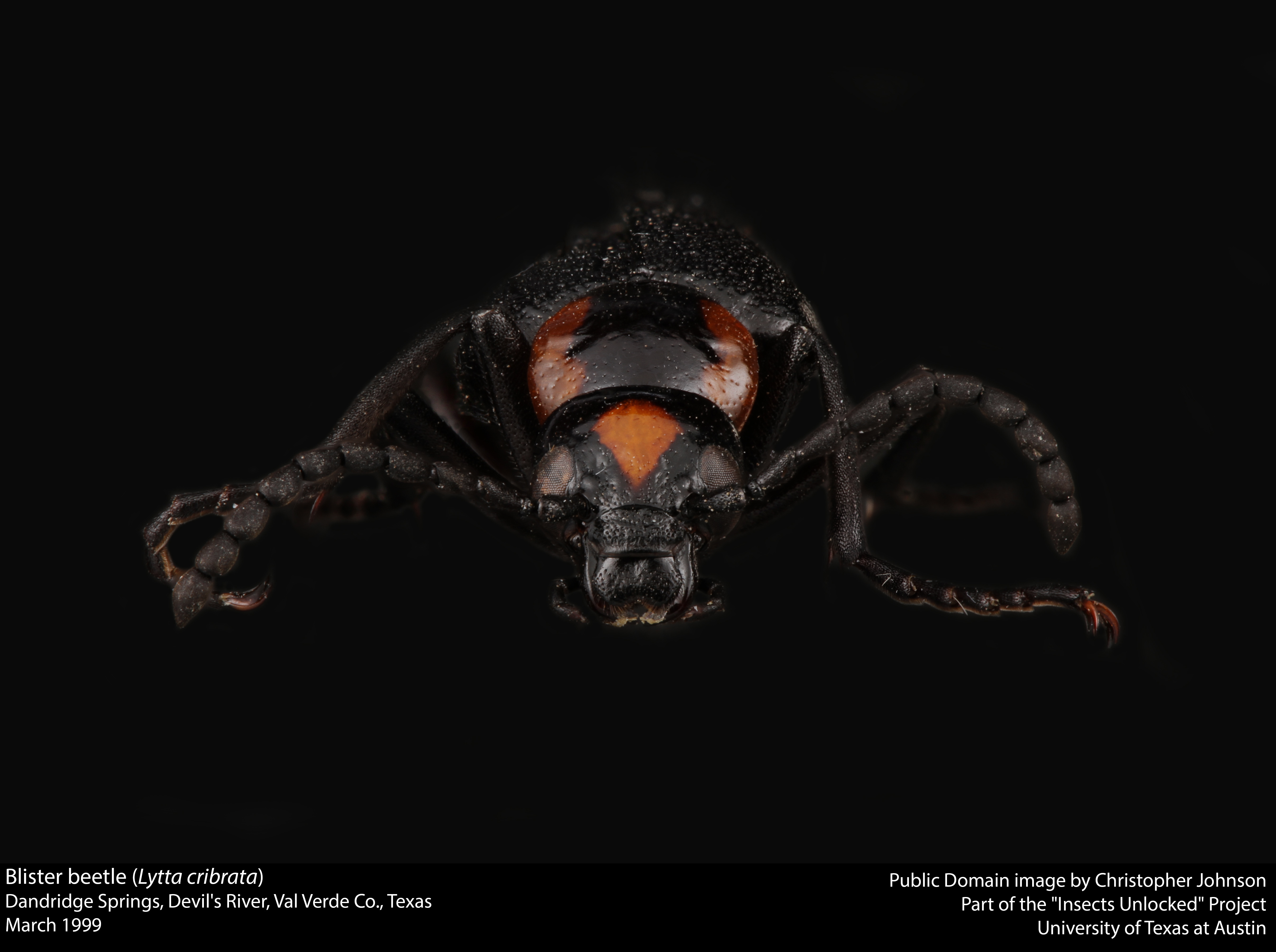

Scientific classification
- Domain: Eukaryota
- Kingdom: Animalia
- Phylum: Arthropoda
- Class: Insecta
- Order: Coleoptera
- Suborder: Polyphaga
- Infraorder: Cucujiformia
- Family: Meloidae
- Genus: Lytta
- Species: L. cribrata

Binomial name
- Lytta cribrata LeConte, 1853

= Lytta cribrata =

Species of beetle

Lytta cribrata is a species of blister beetle in the family Meloidae. It is found in Central America and North America.
