= Lytta biguttata =

Scientific classification
- Domain: Eukaryota
- Kingdom: Animalia
- Phylum: Arthropoda
- Class: Insecta
- Order: Coleoptera
- Suborder: Polyphaga
- Infraorder: Cucujiformia
- Family: Meloidae
- Genus: Lytta
- Species: L. biguttata

Binomial name
- Lytta biguttata LeConte, 1853

Species of beetle

Lytta biguttata is a species of blister beetle in the family Meloidae. It is found in Central America and North America.
