= Lytta deserticola =

Scientific classification
- Kingdom: Animalia
- Phylum: Arthropoda
- Clade: Pancrustacea
- Class: Insecta
- Order: Coleoptera
- Suborder: Polyphaga
- Infraorder: Cucujiformia
- Family: Meloidae
- Genus: Lytta
- Species: L. deserticola

Binomial name
- Lytta deserticola Horn, 1870

Species of beetle

Lytta deserticola is a species of blister beetle in the family Meloidae. It is found in Central America and North America.
