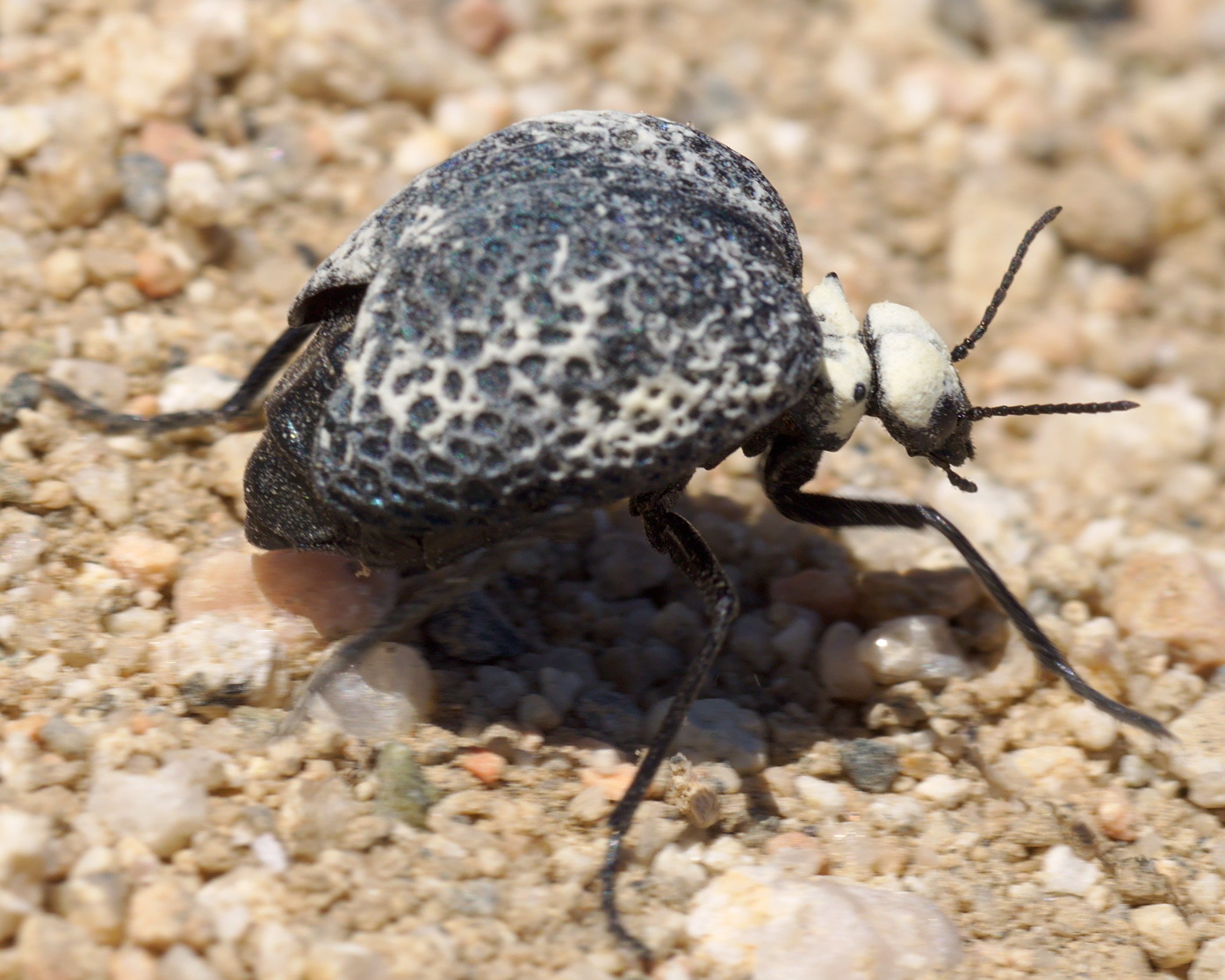
- Cysteodemus armatus

Scientific classification
- Kingdom: Animalia
- Phylum: Arthropoda
- Class: Insecta
- Order: Coleoptera
- Suborder: Polyphaga
- Infraorder: Cucujiformia
- Family: Meloidae
- Subfamily: Meloinae
- Tribe: Eupomphini
- Genus: Cysteodemus; LeConte, 1851

= Cysteodemus =

Genus of beetles

Cysteodemus is a genus of desert spider beetles in the family Meloidae. There are at least two described species in Cysteodemus.

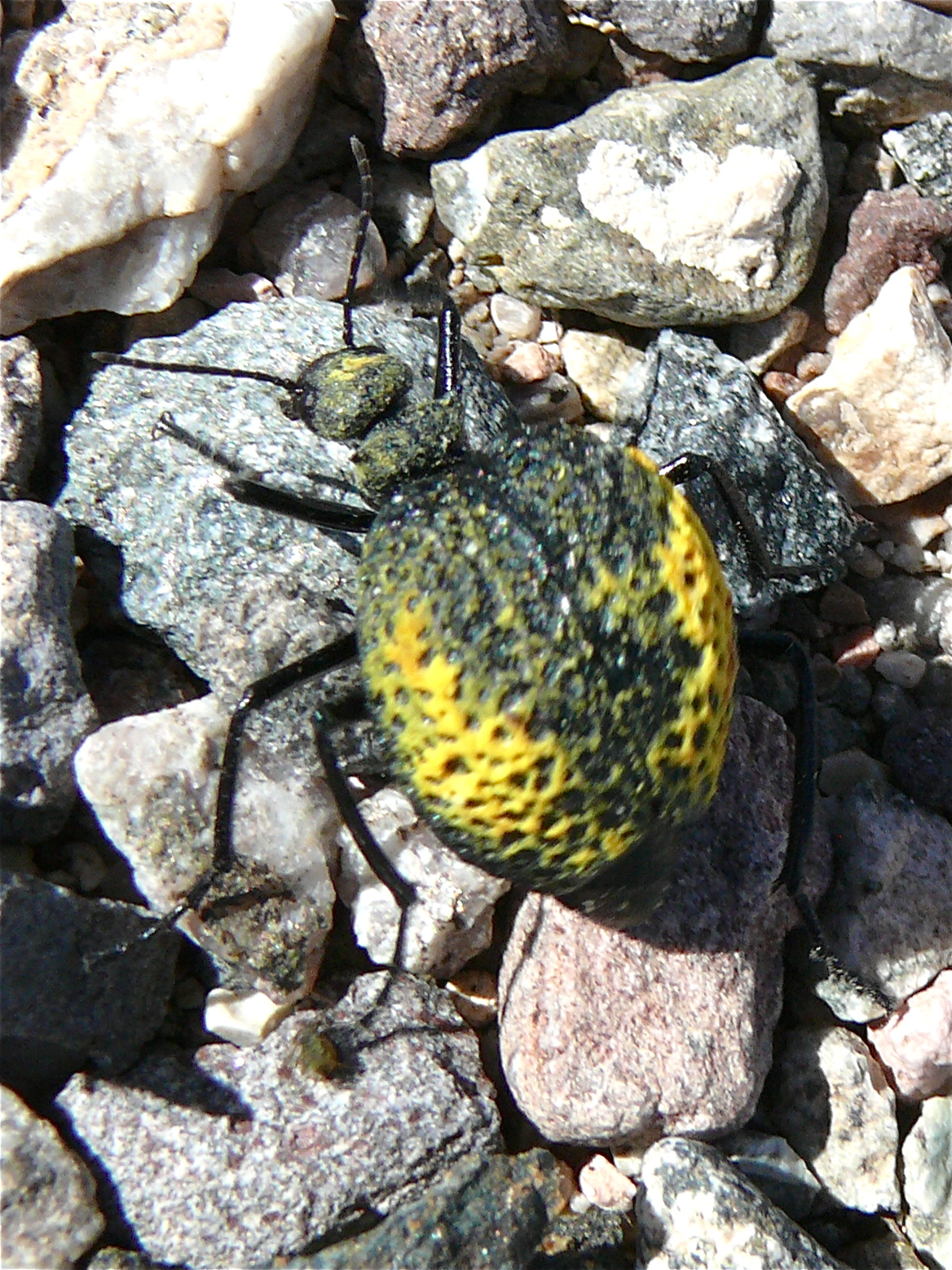
Cysteodemus armatus

== Species ==
These two species belong to the genus Cysteodemus:

- Cysteodemus armatus LeConte, 1851 (inflated beetle)
- Cysteodemus wislizeni LeConte, 1851 (black bladder-bodied meloid)
