= Lytta aeneipennis =

Scientific classification
- Kingdom: Animalia
- Phylum: Arthropoda
- Class: Insecta
- Order: Coleoptera
- Suborder: Polyphaga
- Infraorder: Cucujiformia
- Family: Meloidae
- Genus: Lytta
- Species: L. aeneipennis

Binomial name
- Lytta aeneipennis (LeConte, 1851)

Species of beetle

Lytta aeneipennis is a species of blister beetle in the family Meloidae. It is found in North America. Like other blister beetles, L. aeneipennis produces cantharidin, a toxic chemical compound that causes blistering of the skin upon contact, which serves as a defense mechanism against predators.
