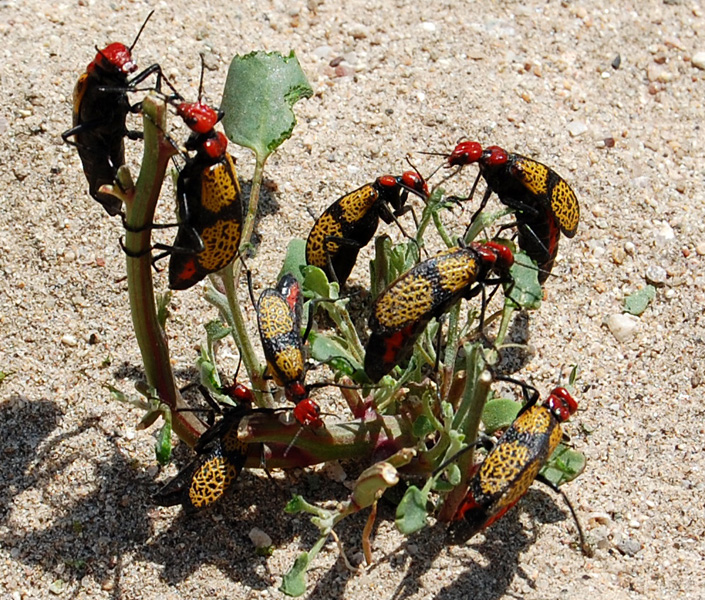
- Tegrodera aloga

Scientific classification
- Kingdom: Animalia
- Phylum: Arthropoda
- Class: Insecta
- Order: Coleoptera
- Suborder: Polyphaga
- Infraorder: Cucujiformia
- Family: Meloidae
- Subfamily: Meloinae
- Tribe: Eupomphini
- Genus: Tegrodera; LeConte, 1851

= Tegrodera =

Genus of beetles

Tegrodera is a genus of beetles known as iron cross blister beetles and soldier blister beetles. They are in the family Meloidae. There are three described species in Tegrodera.

== Species ==
- Tegrodera aloga Skinner, 1903^{i c g b} (iron cross blister beetle)
- Tegrodera erosa LeConte, 1851^{i c g b}
- Tegrodera latecincta Horn, 1891^{i c g b}

Data sources: i = ITIS, c = Catalogue of Life, g = GBIF, b = Bugguide.net
