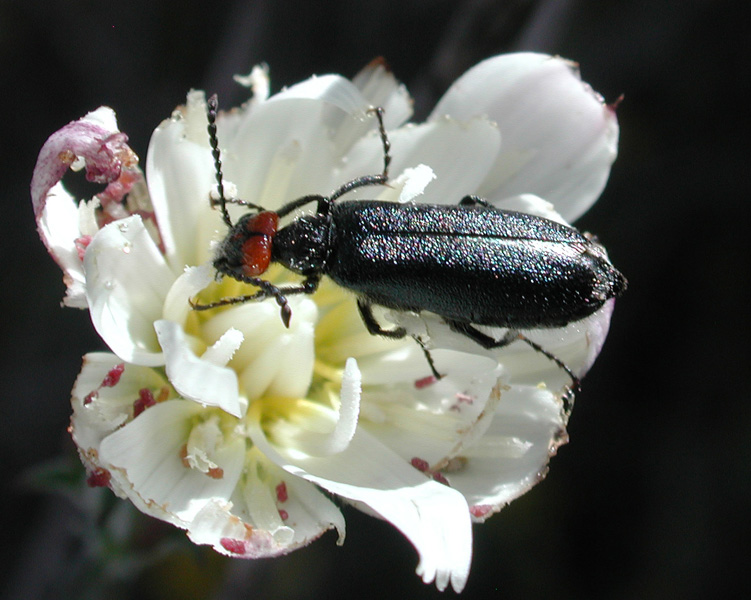

Scientific classification
- Kingdom: Animalia
- Phylum: Arthropoda
- Clade: Pancrustacea
- Class: Insecta
- Order: Coleoptera
- Suborder: Polyphaga
- Infraorder: Cucujiformia
- Family: Meloidae
- Genus: Lytta
- Species: L. auriculata

Binomial name
- Lytta auriculata Horn, 1870

= Lytta auriculata =

Species of beetle

Lytta auriculata, the red-eared blister beetle, is a species of blister beetles in the family Meloidae. It is found in Central America and North America.
