= Lytta melaena =

Scientific classification
- Kingdom: Animalia
- Phylum: Arthropoda
- Clade: Pancrustacea
- Class: Insecta
- Order: Coleoptera
- Suborder: Polyphaga
- Infraorder: Cucujiformia
- Family: Meloidae
- Genus: Lytta
- Species: L. melaena

Binomial name
- Lytta melaena LeConte, 1858

Species of beetle

Lytta melaena is a species of blister beetle in the family Meloidae. It is found in North America.
