= Lytta morrisoni =

Scientific classification
- Domain: Eukaryota
- Kingdom: Animalia
- Phylum: Arthropoda
- Class: Insecta
- Order: Coleoptera
- Suborder: Polyphaga
- Infraorder: Cucujiformia
- Family: Meloidae
- Genus: Lytta
- Species: L. morrisoni

Binomial name
- Lytta morrisoni (Horn, 1891)

Species of beetle

Lytta morrisoni, or Morrison's blister beetle, is a species of blister beetle in the family Meloidae. It is found in North America.
