= Cysteodemus wislizeni =

Scientific classification
- Domain: Eukaryota
- Kingdom: Animalia
- Phylum: Arthropoda
- Class: Insecta
- Order: Coleoptera
- Suborder: Polyphaga
- Infraorder: Cucujiformia
- Family: Meloidae
- Genus: Cysteodemus
- Species: C. wislizeni

Binomial name
- Cysteodemus wislizeni LeConte, 1851

Species of beetle

Cysteodemus wislizeni, the black bladder-bodied meloid, is a species of blister beetle in the family Meloidae. It is found in Central America and North America.
