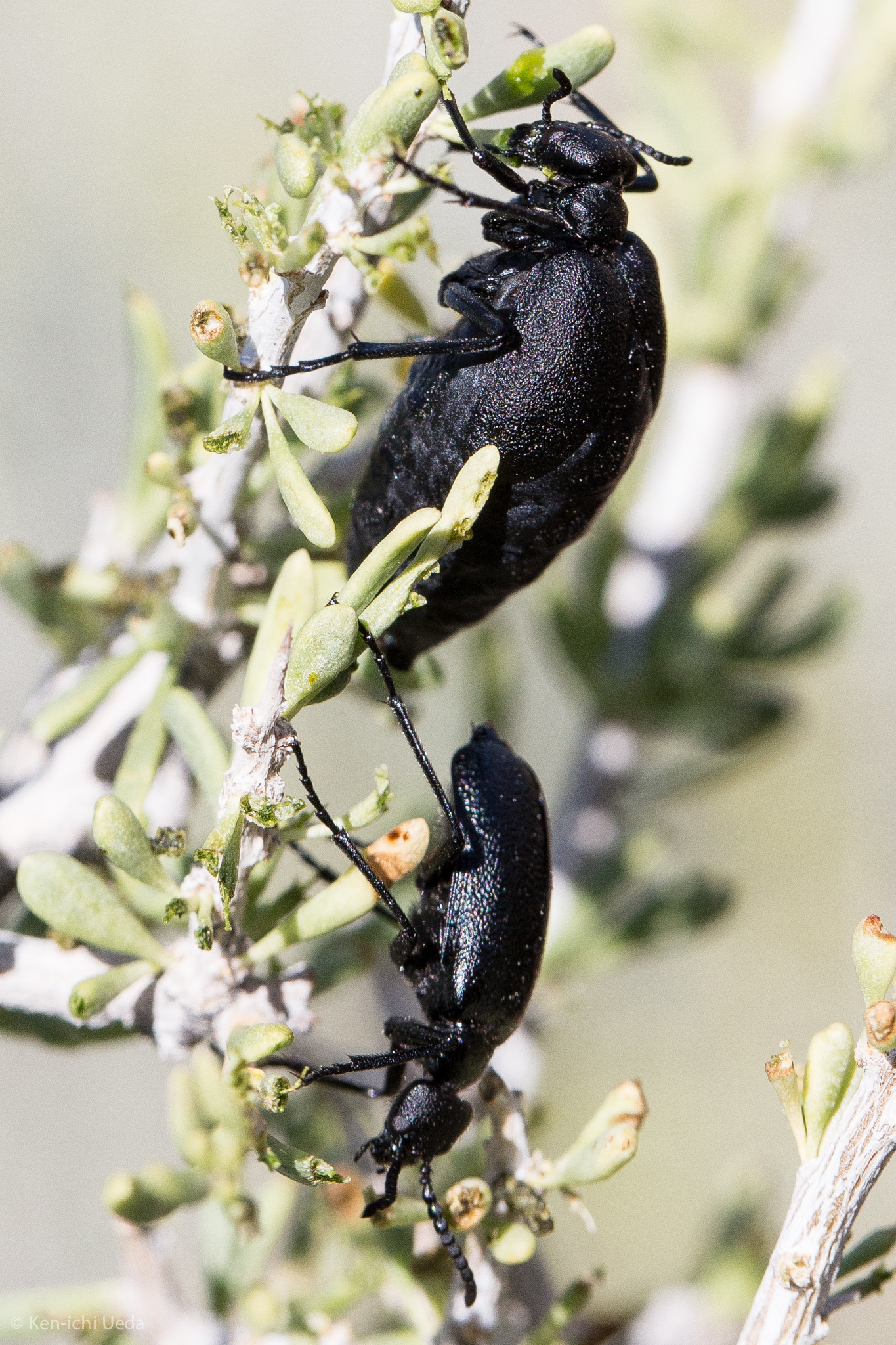
- Female (upper) and male (lower) individuals of Cordylospasta opaca

Scientific classification
- Domain: Eukaryota
- Kingdom: Animalia
- Phylum: Arthropoda
- Class: Insecta
- Order: Coleoptera
- Suborder: Polyphaga
- Infraorder: Cucujiformia
- Family: Meloidae
- Subfamily: Meloinae
- Tribe: Eupomphini
- Genus: Cordylospasta; Horn, 1875

= Cordylospasta =

Genus of beetles

Cordylospasta is a genus of blister beetles in the family Meloidae. There are at least two described species in Cordylospasta.

== Species ==
These two species belong to the genus Cordylospasta:

- Cordylospasta fulleri Horn, 1875
- Cordylospasta opaca (Horn, 1868)
