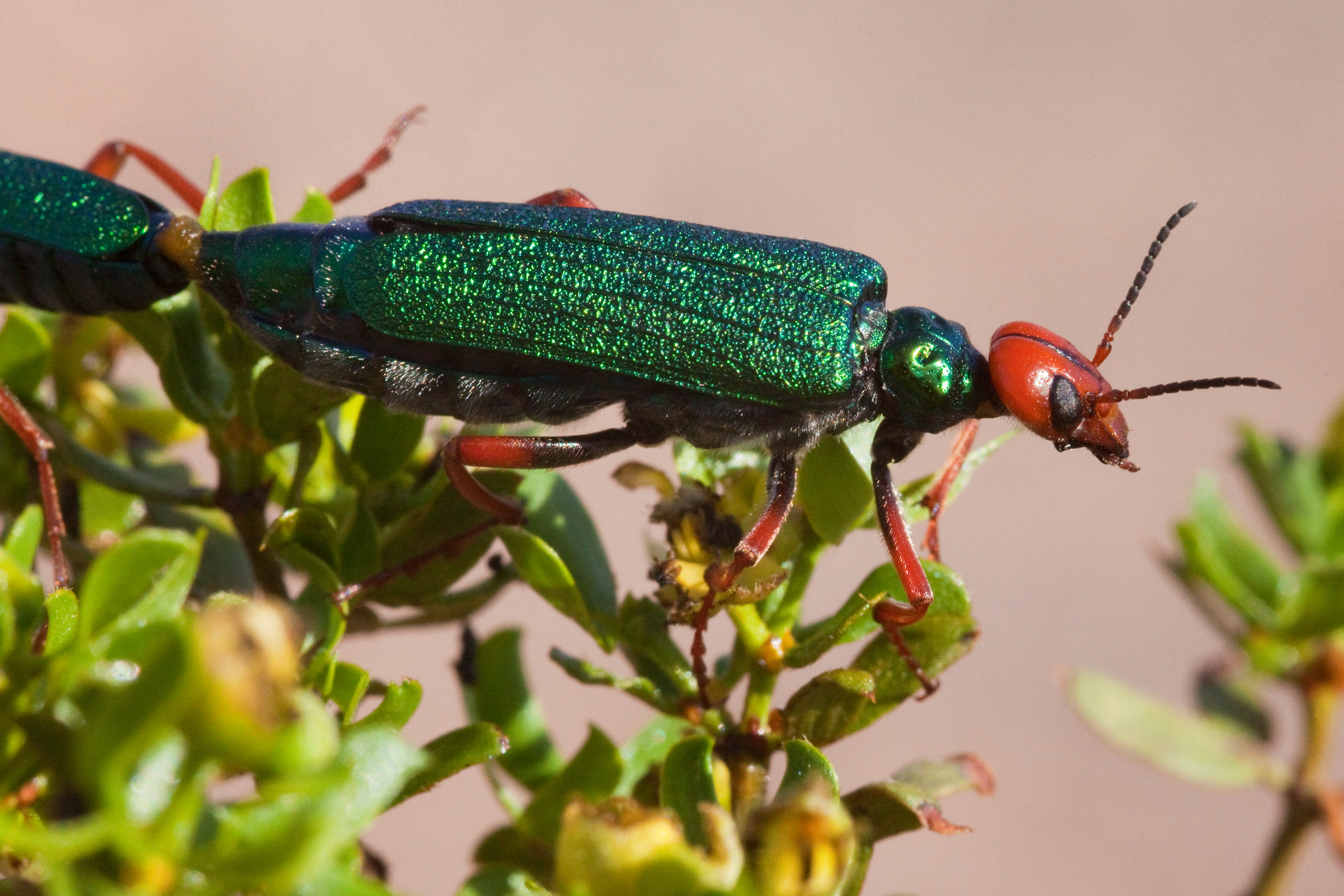

Scientific classification
- Kingdom: Animalia
- Phylum: Arthropoda
- Class: Insecta
- Order: Coleoptera
- Suborder: Polyphaga
- Infraorder: Cucujiformia
- Family: Meloidae
- Genus: Eupompha
- Species: E. fissiceps

Binomial name
- Eupompha fissiceps LeConte, 1858

= Eupompha fissiceps =

Cleft-headed Blister Beetle

Species of beetle

Eupompha fissiceps is a species of blister beetle in the family Meloidae. It is commonly called the cleft-headed blister beetle. It is found in Central America and North America.
