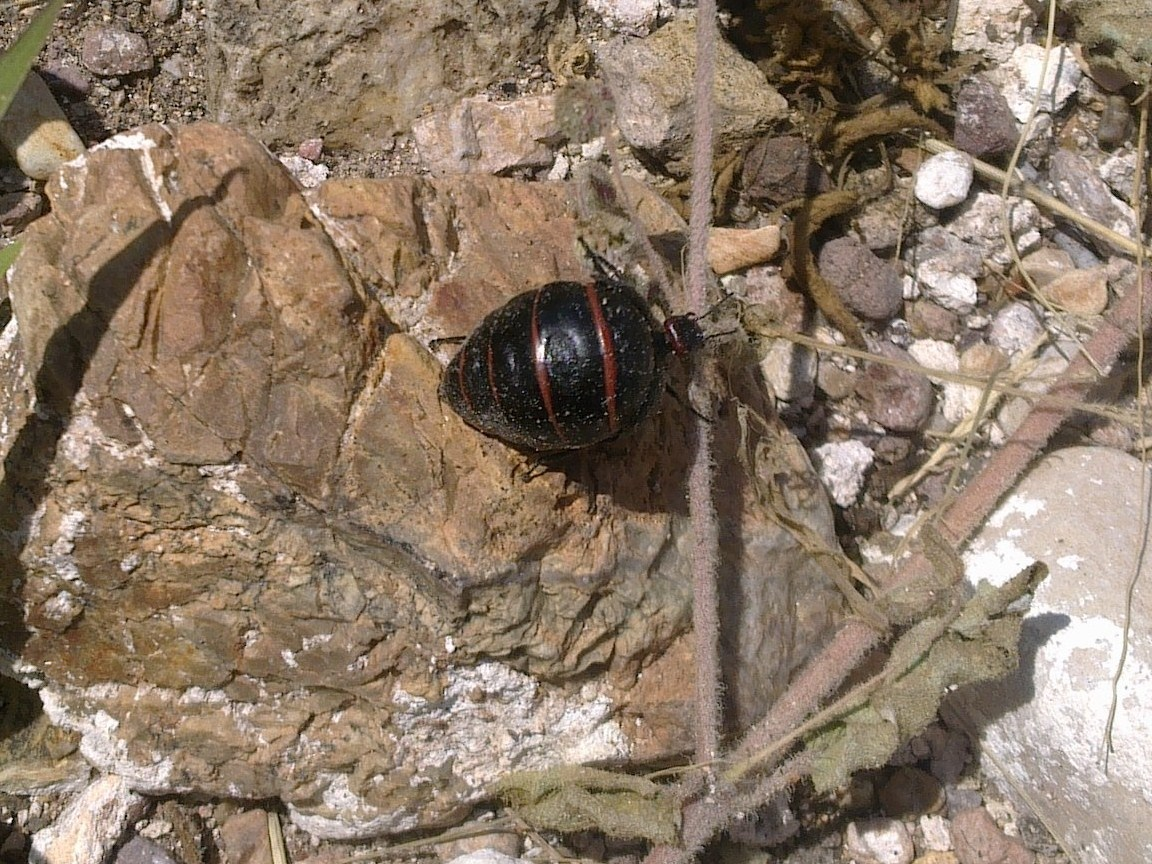
- Megetra spp.

Scientific classification
- Kingdom: Animalia
- Phylum: Arthropoda
- Class: Insecta
- Order: Coleoptera
- Suborder: Polyphaga
- Infraorder: Cucujiformia
- Family: Meloidae
- Subfamily: Meloinae
- Tribe: Eupomphini
- Genus: Megetra; LeConte, 1859

= Megetra =

Genus of beetles

Megetra is a genus of blister beetles in the family Meloidae. There are at least three described species in Megetra.

== Species ==
These three species belong to the genus Megetra:

- Megetra cancellata (Brandt & Erichson, 1832)
- Megetra punctata Selander, 1965
- Megetra vittata (LeConte, 1853)
