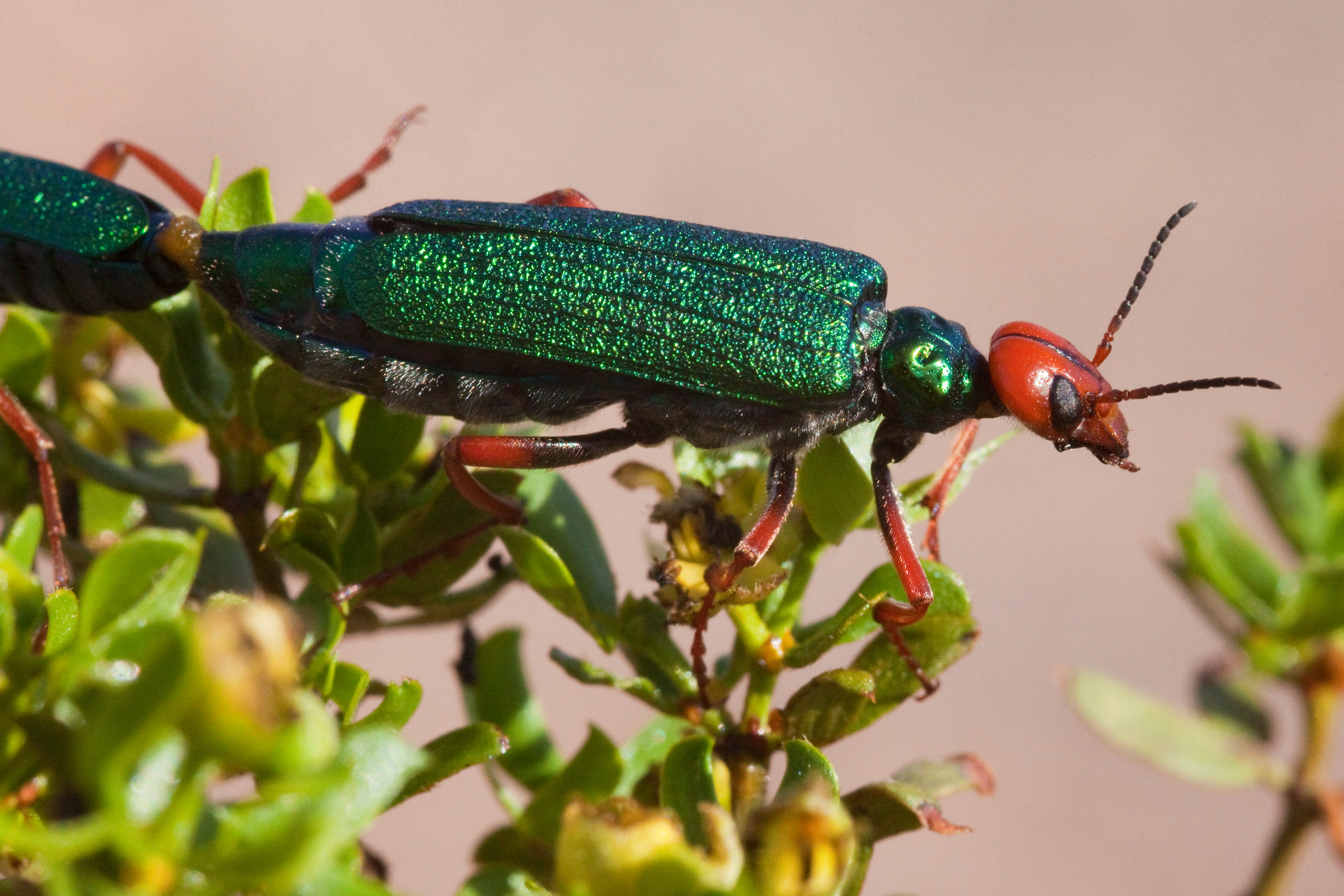
- Eupompha fissiceps

Scientific classification
- Kingdom: Animalia
- Phylum: Arthropoda
- Class: Insecta
- Order: Coleoptera
- Suborder: Polyphaga
- Infraorder: Cucujiformia
- Family: Meloidae
- Subfamily: Meloinae
- Tribe: Eupomphini
- Genus: Eupompha; LeConte, 1858

= Eupompha =

Genus of beetles

Eupompha is a genus of blister beetles in the family Meloidae. There are about 14 described species in Eupompha.

== Species ==
These 14 species belong to the genus Eupompha:

- Eupompha decolorata (Horn, 1894)
- Eupompha edmundsi Selander, 1953
- Eupompha elegans (LeConte, 1852)
- Eupompha fissiceps LeConte, 1858
- Eupompha fulleri Horn, 1878
- Eupompha histrionica Horn, 1891
- Eupompha imperialis Wellman, 1912
- Eupompha perpulchra Horn, 1870
- Eupompha schwarzi Wellman, 1909
- Eupompha sulcifrons Champion, 1892
- Eupompha terminalis Selander, 1957
- Eupompha viridis Horn, 1883
- Eupompha vizcaina Pinto, 1983
- Eupompha wenzeli Skinner, 1904
