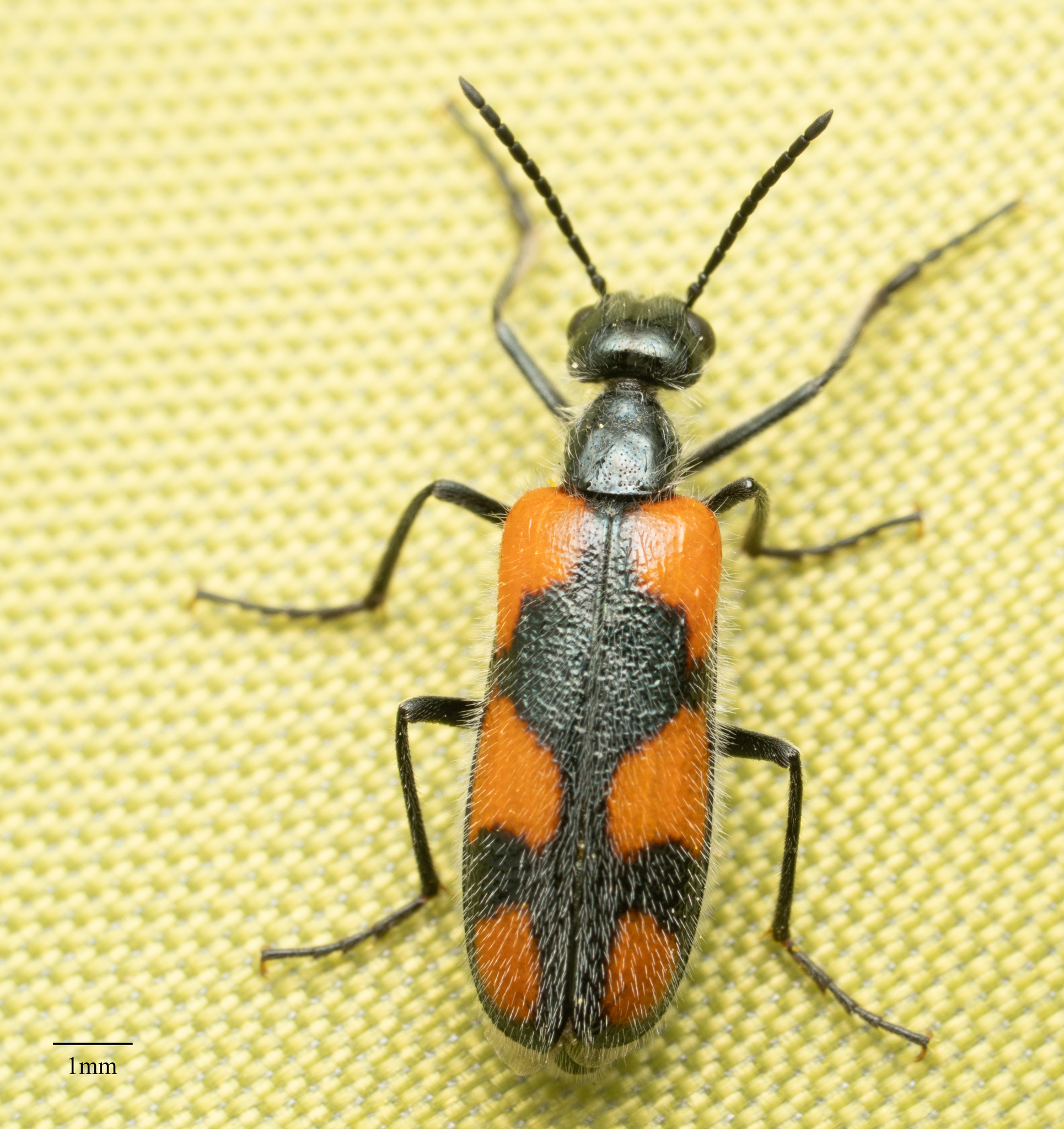
- E. elegans perpulchra

Scientific classification
- Domain: Eukaryota
- Kingdom: Animalia
- Phylum: Arthropoda
- Class: Insecta
- Order: Coleoptera
- Suborder: Polyphaga
- Infraorder: Cucujiformia
- Family: Meloidae
- Genus: Eupompha
- Species: E. elegans

Binomial name
- Eupompha elegans (LeConte, 1852)

= Eupompha elegans =

Species of beetle

Eupompha elegans is a species of blister beetle in the family Meloidae. It is found in Central America and North America.

== Subspecies ==
These two subspecies belong to the species Eupompha elegans:

- Eupompha elegans elegans
- Eupompha elegans perpulchra
