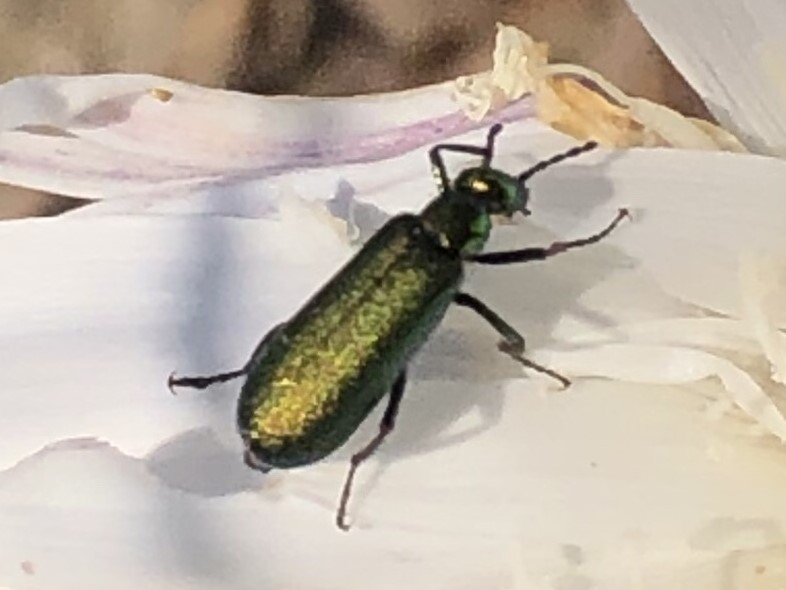

Scientific classification
- Kingdom: Animalia
- Phylum: Arthropoda
- Clade: Pancrustacea
- Class: Insecta
- Order: Coleoptera
- Suborder: Polyphaga
- Infraorder: Cucujiformia
- Family: Meloidae
- Genus: Lytta
- Species: L. stygica

Binomial name
- Lytta stygica (LeConte, 1851)

= Lytta stygica =

Species of beetle

Lytta stygica is a species of blister beetle in the family Meloidae. It is found in North America.

== Taxonomy ==
Lytta stygica was described by the American entomologist John Lawrence LeConte in 1851. It belongs to the genus Lytta, a group of blister beetles in the family Meloidae. L. stygica is placed in the stygica species group, which contains several closely related species that are predominantly distributed in California. The group includes L. stygica along with species such as L. sublaevis, L. auriculata, L. nigripilis, L. hoppingi, L. lugens, L. aeneipennis, L. refulgens, L. crotchi, L. chloris, L. rathvoni, and L. comans. According to Selander's revision of the genus, the stygica group is largely confined to California, although L. stygica and L. auriculata have ranges extending beyond the state.

== Distribution and Habitat ==
Lytta stygica occurs in western North America and has been recorded from California and British Columbia. Records from California include locations in the San Gabriel Mountains, Anza-Borrego Desert State Park, and Mendocino County. The species has been observed in a variety of habitats, including mountainous areas and more arid environments. Adults are associated with flowering plants and have been recorded feeding on several species, including California chicory (Rafinesquia neomexicana), western wallflower (Erysimum capitatum), and Toxicoscordion fremontii. A study of the genus Lytta reported that adults commonly occur on flowers of Eschscholzia and Ceanothus, although a variety of other plants may also serve as hosts.
