= Cordylospasta fulleri =

Scientific classification
- Domain: Eukaryota
- Kingdom: Animalia
- Phylum: Arthropoda
- Class: Insecta
- Order: Coleoptera
- Suborder: Polyphaga
- Infraorder: Cucujiformia
- Family: Meloidae
- Tribe: Eupomphini
- Genus: Cordylospasta
- Species: C. fulleri

Binomial name
- Cordylospasta fulleri Horn, 1875

Species of beetle

Cordylospasta fulleri is a species of blister beetle in the family Meloidae. It is found in North America.
