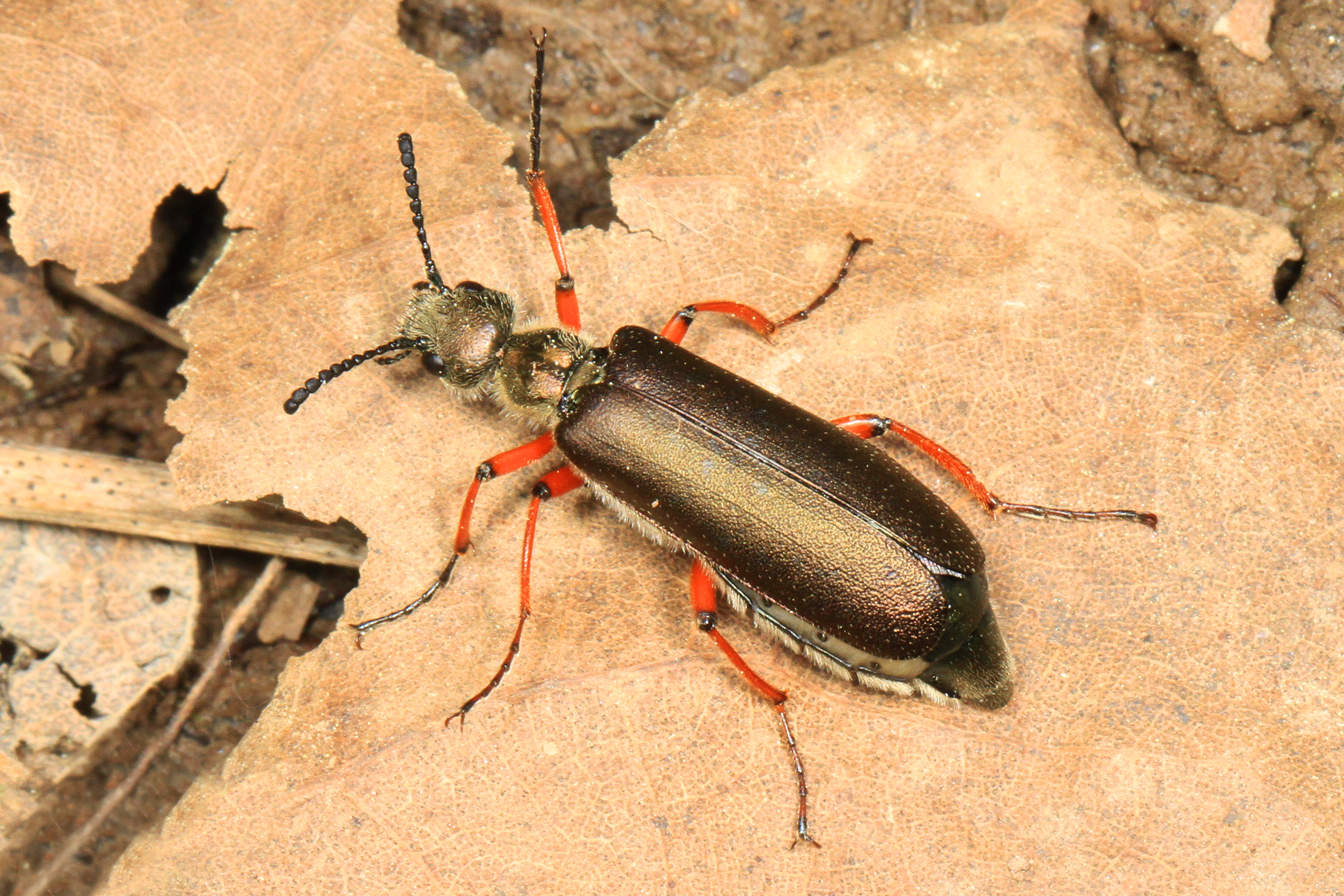

Scientific classification
- Kingdom: Animalia
- Phylum: Arthropoda
- Clade: Pancrustacea
- Class: Insecta
- Order: Coleoptera
- Suborder: Polyphaga
- Infraorder: Cucujiformia
- Family: Meloidae
- Genus: Lytta
- Species: L. aenea

Binomial name
- Lytta aenea Say, 1824

= Lytta aenea =

Species of beetle

Lytta aenea is a species of blister beetle in the family Meloidae. It is found in eastern North America from Texas to New England and as far west as the Great Plains. The species is named for the bronze color of its elytrons.

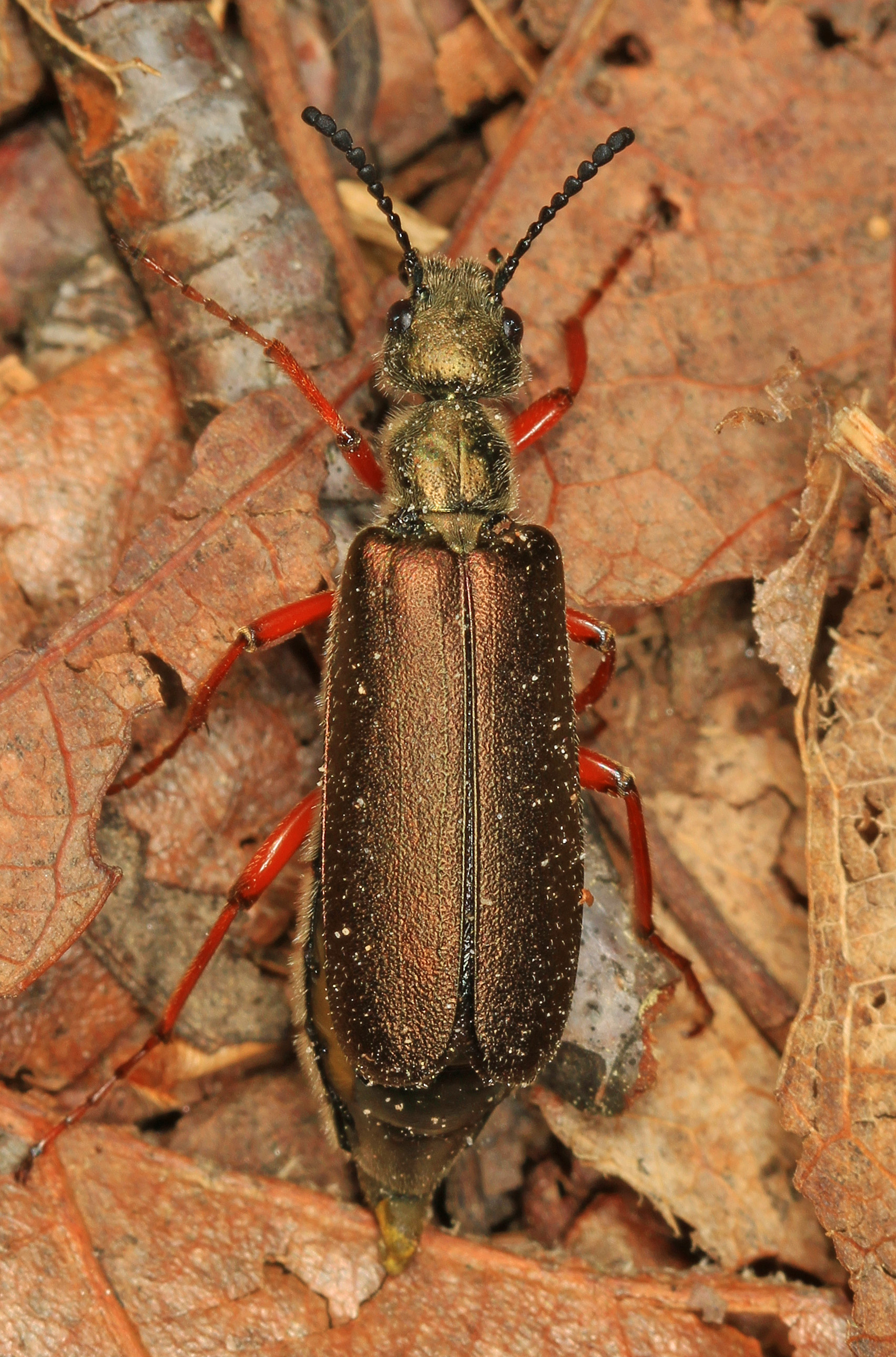

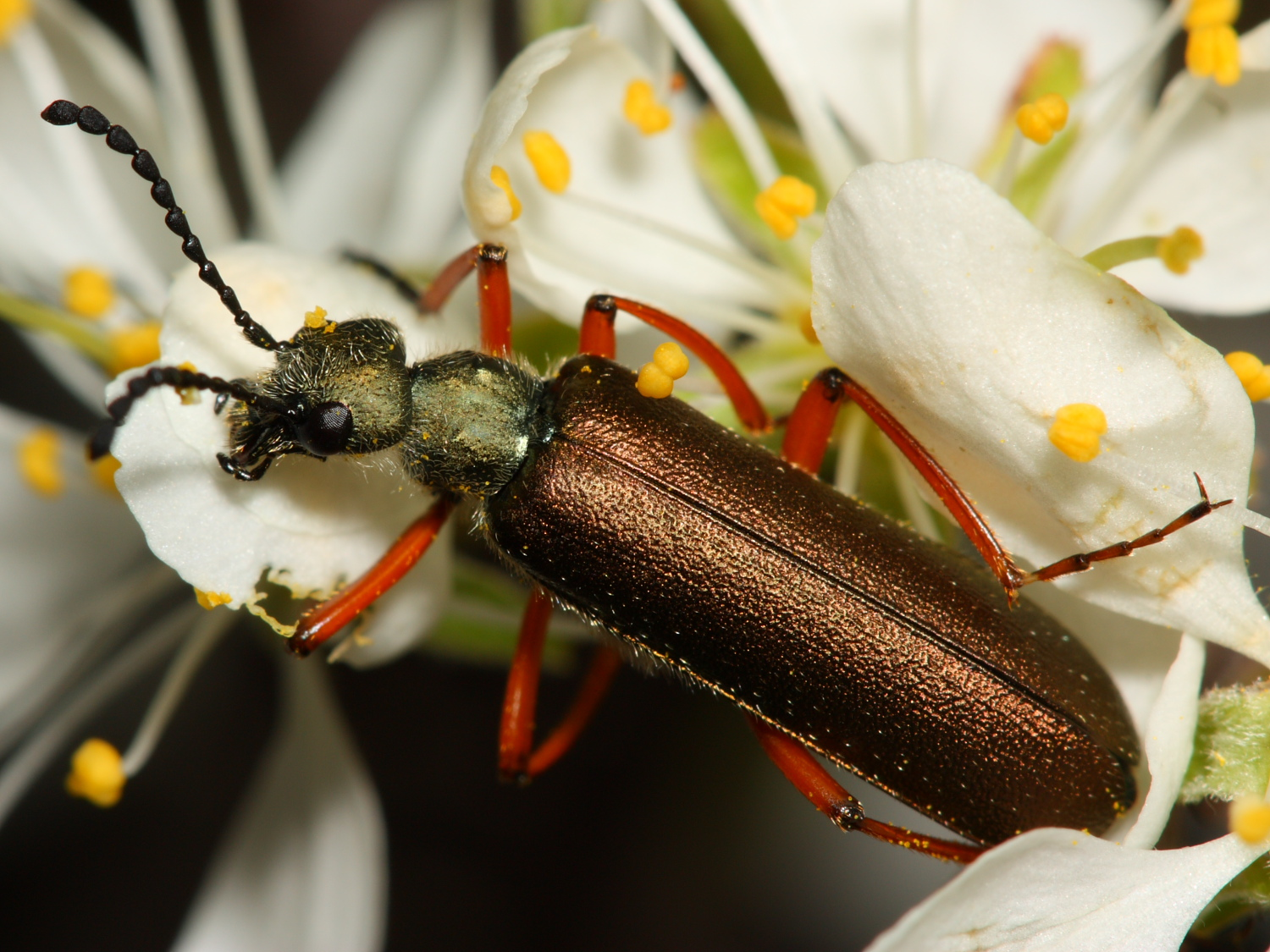

It primarily feeds on flowers of the family Rosaceae. Additional food sources include willow flowers, hickory flowers, and oak leaves.
