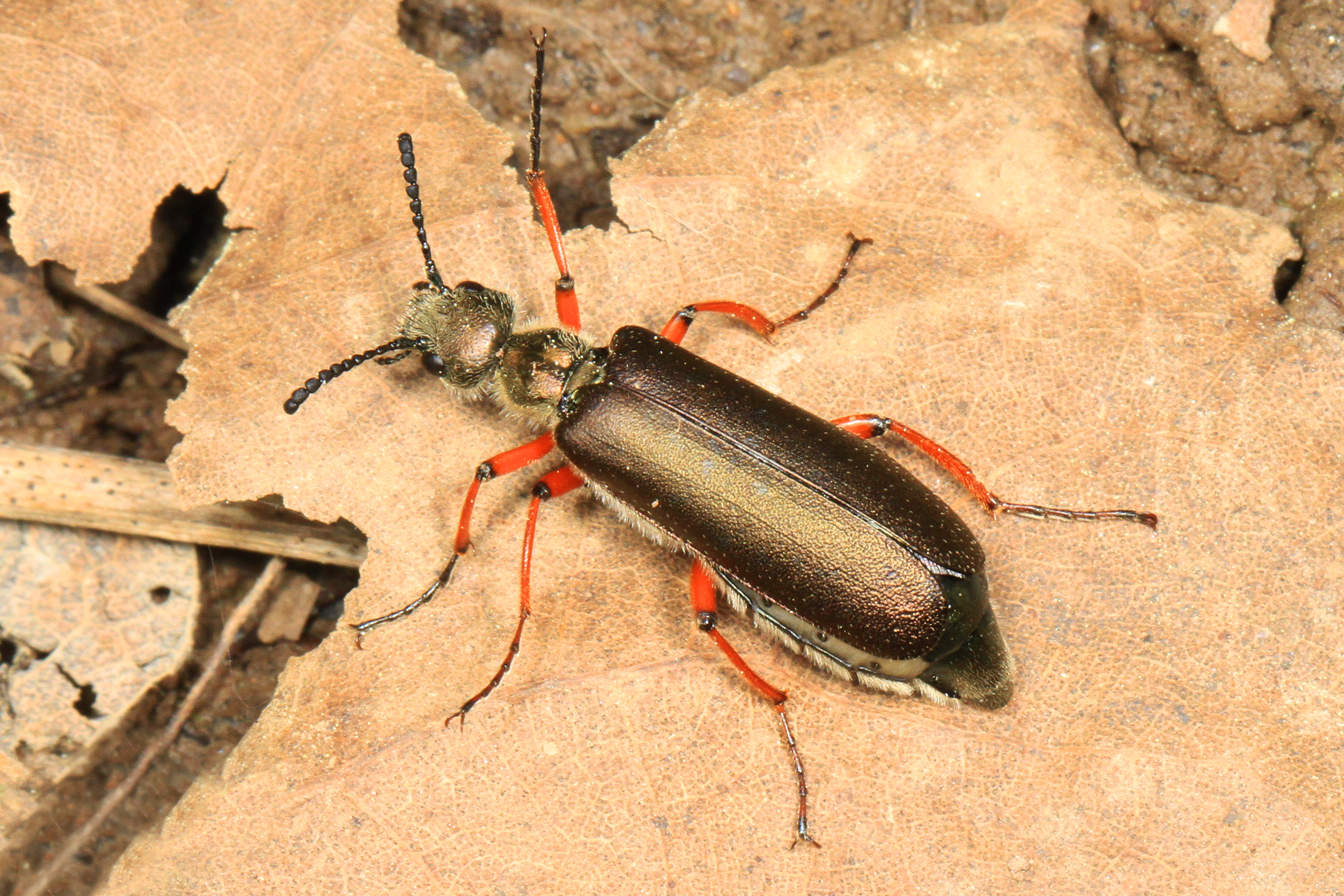
- Lytta aenea

Scientific classification
- Kingdom: Animalia
- Phylum: Arthropoda
- Class: Insecta
- Order: Coleoptera
- Suborder: Polyphaga
- Infraorder: Cucujiformia
- Family: Meloidae
- Subfamily: Meloinae; Gyllenhal, 1810

= Meloinae =

Subfamily of beetles

Meloinae is a subfamily of beetles in the family Meloidae. There are at least 330 described species in Meloinae.

== Genera ==
- Cordylospasta Horn, 1875
- Cysteodemus LeConte, 1851 (desert spider beetles)
- Epicauta Dejean, 1834
- Eupompha LeConte, 1858
- Linsleya MacSwain, 1951
- Lytta Fabricius, 1775
- Megetra LeConte, 1859
- Meloe Linnaeus, 1758 (oil beetles)
- Phodaga LeConte, 1858
- Pleuropasta Wellman, 1909
- Pyrota Dejean, 1834
- Spastonyx Selander, 1954
- Tegrodera LeConte, 1851 (iron cross blister beetles)
