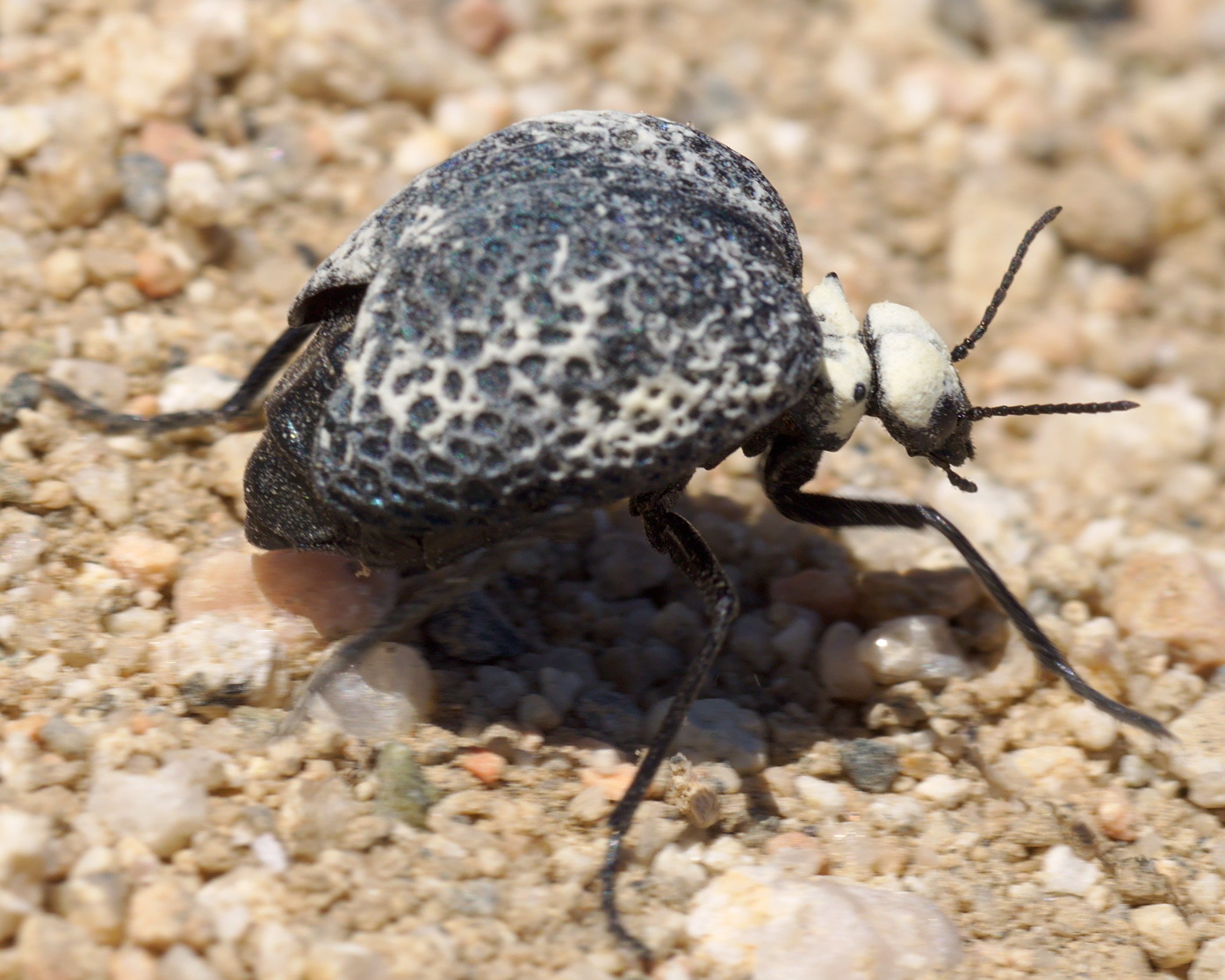
- Cysteodemus armatus

Scientific classification
- Kingdom: Animalia
- Phylum: Arthropoda
- Class: Insecta
- Order: Coleoptera
- Suborder: Polyphaga
- Infraorder: Cucujiformia
- Family: Meloidae
- Subfamily: Meloinae
- Tribe: Eupomphini; LeConte, 1862

= Eupomphini =

Tribe of beetles

Eupomphini is a tribe of blister beetles in the family Meloidae. There are about 7 genera and more than 20 described species in Eupomphini.

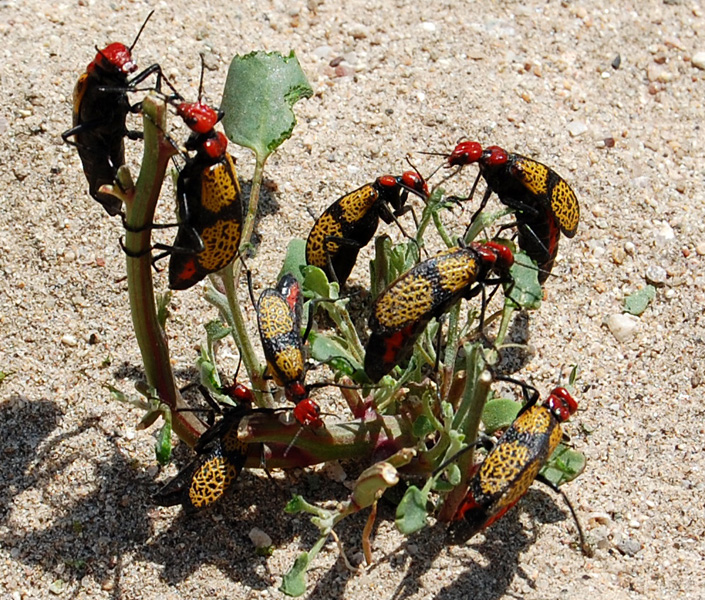
Tegrodera latecincta

== Genera ==
These seven genera belong to the tribe Eupomphini:

- Cordylospasta Horn, 1875
- Cysteodemus LeConte, 1851 (desert spider beetles)
- Eupompha LeConte, 1858
- Megetra LeConte, 1859
- Phodaga LeConte, 1858
- Pleuropasta Wellman, 1909
- Tegrodera LeConte, 1851 (iron cross blister beetles)
