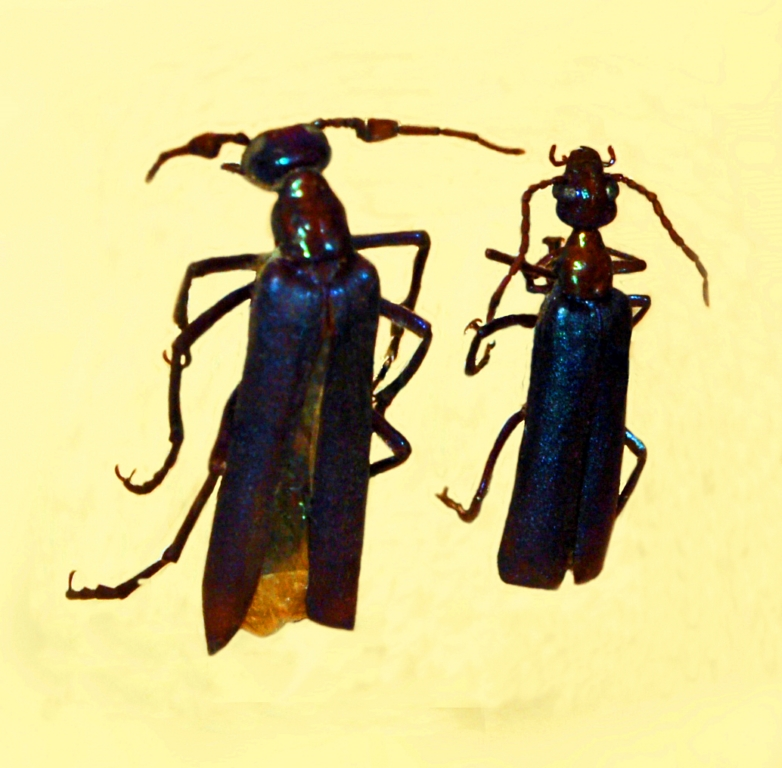
- Lydomorphus dusaulti from Ethiopia

Scientific classification
- Kingdom: Animalia
- Phylum: Arthropoda
- Clade: Pancrustacea
- Class: Insecta
- Order: Coleoptera
- Suborder: Polyphaga
- Infraorder: Cucujiformia
- Family: Meloidae
- Genus: Lydomorphus
- Species: L. dusaulti

Binomial name
- Lydomorphus dusaulti (Dufour, 1821)

Synonyms
- Cylindrothorax dusaulti Dufour, 1821

= Lydomorphus dusaulti =

Species of beetle

Lydomorphus dusaulti is a species of beetle in family Meloidae.
