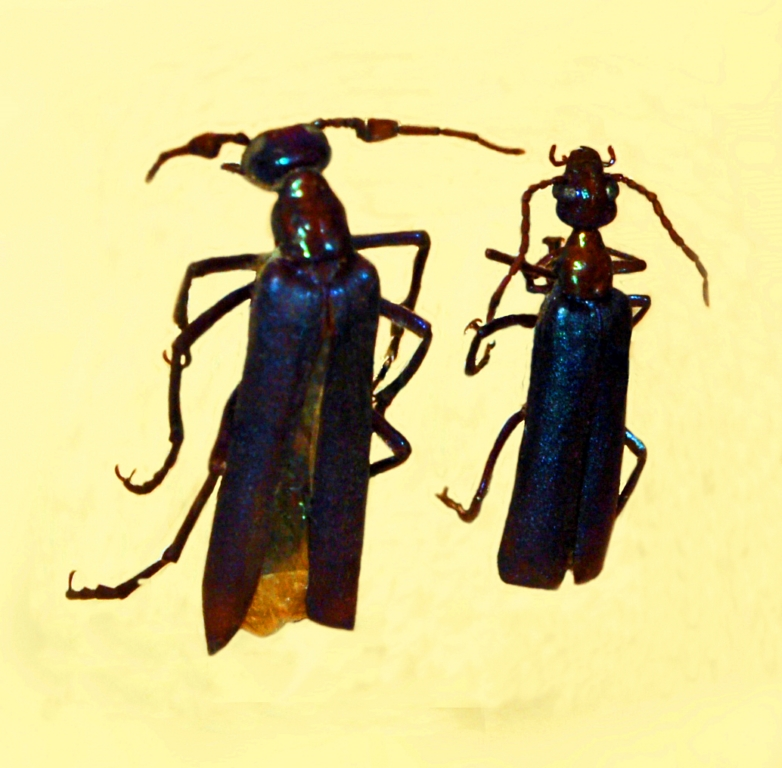
- Lydomorphus dusaulti

Scientific classification
- Kingdom: Animalia
- Phylum: Arthropoda
- Clade: Pancrustacea
- Class: Insecta
- Order: Coleoptera
- Suborder: Polyphaga
- Infraorder: Cucujiformia
- Family: Meloidae
- Tribe: Lyttini
- Genus: Lydomorphus; Fairmaire, 1882

= Lydomorphus =

Genus of beetles

Lydomorphus is a genus of beetle in family Meloidae, containing the following selected species:

- Lydomorphus chanzyi (Fairmaire, 1876)
- Lydomorphus dusaulti (Dufour, 1821)
- Lydomorphus palaestinus (Kirsch, 1870)
- Lydomorphus saharanus (Kaszab, 1961)
- Lydomorphus verrucicollis (Karsh, 1881)
