= Microserica =

Scientific classification
- Kingdom: Animalia
- Phylum: Arthropoda
- Clade: Pancrustacea
- Class: Insecta
- Order: Coleoptera
- Suborder: Polyphaga
- Infraorder: Scarabaeiformia
- Family: Scarabaeidae
- Tribe: Sericini
- Subtribe: Sericina
- Genus: Microserica; Brenske, 1894

Genus of leaf beetles

Microserica is a genus of beetles belonging to the family Scarabaeidae.

== Species ==
- Microserica abbreviata Brenske, 1899
- Microserica affinis Arrow, 1946
- Microserica agraria Brenske, 1899
- Microserica allovarians Ahrens, Lukic & Liu, 2023
- Microserica arorogensis Moser, 1922
- Microserica avicula (Arrow, 1946)
- Microserica balabacensis Moser, 1922
- Microserica balbalana Moser, 1922
- Microserica banlaoana Ahrens, Lukic & Liu, 2023
- Microserica batoensis Moser, 1924
- Microserica beccarii Ahrens, 2003
- Microserica benomensis Ahrens, 2002
- Microserica biapoensis Ahrens, 2002
- Microserica bifasciata Ahrens, 2003
- Microserica binaluana Moser, 1922
- Microserica caiyangheana Ahrens, Lukic & Liu, 2023
- Microserica calapana Moser, 1922
- Microserica chaiyaphum Ahrens, Lukic & Liu, 2023
- Microserica confusa Moser, 1916
- Microserica corporaali Moser, 1917
- Microserica costisquamosa (Ahrens, Fabrizi & Liu, 2019)
- Microserica cucphuong Ahrens, Lukic & Liu, 2023
- Microserica dansalana Moser, 1922
- Microserica difficilis Moser, 1922
- Microserica dohrni Brenske, 1899
- Microserica duplosetosa Moser, 1915
- Microserica fairmairei Brenske, 1899
- Microserica fascigera Moser, 1911
- Microserica fascipennis Moser, 1911
- Microserica feae (Brenske, 1899)
- Microserica ferestictica Ahrens, Lukic & Liu, 2023
- Microserica flaveola Moser, 1911
- Microserica fugax (Erichson, 1834)
- Microserica fulvovittata Moser, 1911
- Microserica globulosa Moser, 1915
- Microserica guamensis Gordon, 1971
- Microserica hastata Brenske, 1899
- Microserica heptaphylla Frey, 1972
- Microserica hexaphylla Moser, 1916
- Microserica hieroglyphica Ahrens, Lukic & Liu, 2023
- Microserica hobokoana Moser, 1922
- Microserica humilis Brenske, 1899
- Microserica imitatrix Moser, 1915
- Microserica iridicolor Moser, 1922
- Microserica kannegieteri Ahrens, 2001
- Microserica kolambugana Moser, 1922
- Microserica lampungensis Ahrens, 2003
- Microserica larutensis Ahrens, 2003
- Microserica latefemorata Moser, 1915
- Microserica liangensis Brenske, 1899
- Microserica limbata (Brenske, 1894)
- Microserica lineatipennis Moser, 1921
- Microserica lineolata Moser, 1915
- Microserica lugens Moser, 1915
- Microserica lugundriensis Ahrens, 2001
- Microserica macrophylla Moser, 1914
- Microserica magnifica Brenske, 1899
- Microserica malaccensis (Brenske, 1893)
- Microserica marginipennis Moser, 1917
- Microserica martini Ahrens, 2001
- Microserica mindoroana Brenske, 1899
- Microserica minuscula Moser, 1915
- Microserica modiglianii Brenske, 1899
- Microserica moultoni Moser, 1911
- Microserica multipunctata Ahrens, Lukic & Liu, 2023
- Microserica mutabilis (Burmeister, 1855)
- Microserica namnao Ahrens, Lukic & Liu, 2023
- Microserica neglecta Moser, 1915
- Microserica negrosiana Brenske, 1899
- Microserica neosimplex Ahrens, Lukic & Liu, 2023
- Microserica nicobarensis (Redtenbacher, 1868)
- Microserica nigra (Brenske, 1899)
- Microserica nigriceps Arrow, 1946
- Microserica nigrolineata Moser, 1911
- Microserica nigrosuturata Moser, 1911
- Microserica nigrovittata Moser, 1911
- Microserica nuda Ahrens, 2003
- Microserica obscurella Moser, 1916
- Microserica oceana (Brenske, 1894)
- Microserica opalina (Burmeister, 1855)
- Microserica ornata (Nonfried, 1894)
- Microserica palawana Brenske, 1899
- Microserica panayana Moser, 1924
- Microserica panzona Ahrens, 2005
- Microserica parasimplex Ahrens, Lukic & Liu, 2023
- Microserica paravicula Ahrens, Lukic & Liu, 2023
- Microserica pentaphylla Moser, 1916
- Microserica perdix Arrow, 1946
- Microserica phanrangensis Ahrens, 2002
- Microserica pisangana Brenske, 1899
- Microserica planiforceps Ahrens, Lukic & Liu, 2023
- Microserica pleophylla (Burmeister, 1855)
- Microserica poggii Ahrens, 2001
- Microserica pontionakana Moser, 1920
- Microserica pusilla (Thunberg, 1818)
- Microserica pyrrhopoecila Brenske, 1899
- Microserica quadrimaculata (Brenske, 1894)
- Microserica quadripustulata Moser, 1915
- Microserica quinquefoliata Moser, 1915
- Microserica quinquelamellata Moser, 1920
- Microserica raapi Ahrens, 2001
- Microserica rufolutea Moser, 1915
- Microserica samarana Brenske, 1899
- Microserica sandakana Moser, 1921
- Microserica sanguineicollis Moser, 1911
- Microserica sarawakana Moser, 1920
- Microserica semitecta Brenske, 1899
- Microserica semperi (Brenske, 1894)
- Microserica septemflabellata Moser, 1916
- Microserica septemfoliata (Frey, 1972)
- Microserica seticeps Moser, 1924
- Microserica sexflabellata Moser, 1913
- Microserica sexlamellata Moser, 1913
- Microserica shelfordi Arrow, 1946
- Microserica sibuyana Moser, 1922
- Microserica simplex Arrow, 1946
- Microserica singalangia Brenske, 1899
- Microserica singaporeana Moser, 1921
- Microserica sitoliensis Moser, 1922
- Microserica soppongensis Ahrens, 2005
- Microserica spilota Moser, 1920
- Microserica splendida Moser, 1924
- Microserica splendidula (Fabricius, 1801)
- Microserica strigata Brenske, 1899
- Microserica strigosa Brenske, 1899
- Microserica striola (Brenske, 1894)
- Microserica suavidica Brenske, 1899
- Microserica thagatana (Brenske, 1899)
- Microserica thai Ahrens, 2002
- Microserica theodoroensis Moser, 1922
- Microserica variicollis Moser, 1922
- Microserica variicornis Moser, 1922
- Microserica viengvai Ahrens, Lukic & Liu, 2023
- Microserica vinden Ahrens, Lukic & Liu, 2023
- Microserica vipinglangensis Ahrens, Lukic & Liu, 2023
- Microserica virgata Moser, 1915
- Microserica viridana Brenske, 1899
- Microserica viridicollis Arrow, 1913
- Microserica viridifrons Moser, 1922
- Microserica vittigera (Blanchard, 1850)
- Microserica vittipennis Moser, 1925
- Microserica zorni Ahrens, 2001

== Selected former species ==
- Microserica annapurnae Ahrens, 1995
- Microserica arrowi Frey, 1972
- Microserica arunensis Ahrens, 1998
- Microserica atropicta Moser, 1915
- Microserica banvaneue Bohacz & Ahrens, 2020
- Microserica bhutanensis Frey, 1975
- Microserica bimaculata (Hope, 1831)
- Microserica brancuccii Ahrens, 2001
- Microserica cechovskyi Ahrens, 1999
- Microserica crenatostriata Ahrens, 2004
- Microserica cribriceps Moser, 1915
- Microserica darjeelingia Brenske, 1898
- Microserica dohertyi Ahrens & Fabrizi, 2009
- Microserica diversicornis Moser, 1915
- Microserica elegans (Frey, 1975)
- Microserica fenestrata Arrow
- Microserica fukiensis (Frey, 1972)
- Microserica gandakiensis Ahrens, 1998
- Microserica geberbauer Ahrens, 2004
- Microserica ginae Bohacz & Ahrens, 2020
- Microserica helferi Bohacz & Ahrens, 2020
- Microserica hellmichi Frey, 1965
- Microserica hispidula Frey, 1975
- Microserica inornata Nomura
- Microserica interrogator (Arrow, 1946)
- Microserica janetscheki Frey, 1969
- Microserica kanchenjungae Ahrens, 2001
- Microserica kurseongana Moser, 1915
- Microserica lineata Moser, 1915
- Microserica longefoliata Frey, 1965
- Microserica lucens Ahrens & Fabrizi, 2009
- Microserica marginata (Brenske, 1896)
- Microserica martensi Ahrens, 1998
- Microserica myagdiana Ahrens, 1998
- Microserica nigropicta (Fairmaire, 1891)
- Microserica pedongensis Ahrens, 1998
- Microserica pruinosa (Hope, 1831)
- Microserica quadrinotata Moser, 1915
- Microserica quadripunctata Brenske, 1896
- Microserica roingensis Ahrens & Fabrizi, 2016
- Microserica schawalleri Ahrens, 1998
- Microserica schulzei Ahrens, 1997
- Microserica squamulata (Moser, 1915)
- Microserica steelei Ahrens, 2004
- Microserica stemmleri Frey, 1975
- Microserica tarsalis Frey, 1960
- Microserica tenasserimensis Bohacz & Ahrens, 2020
- Microserica truncata (Brenske, 1898)
- Microserica varia Frey, 1975
- Microserica varians Moser, 1915
- Microserica ventrosa Bohacz & Ahrens, 2020
