= Microserica imitatrix =

Scientific classification
- Kingdom: Animalia
- Phylum: Arthropoda
- Clade: Pancrustacea
- Class: Insecta
- Order: Coleoptera
- Suborder: Polyphaga
- Infraorder: Scarabaeiformia
- Family: Scarabaeidae
- Genus: Microserica
- Species: M. imitatrix

Binomial name
- Microserica imitatrix Moser, 1915

Species of beetle

Microserica imitatrix is a species of beetle of the family Scarabaeidae. It is found in Malaysia (Sarawak).

== Description ==
Adults reach a length of about 6 mm. The head is green and the frons is dull and sparsely punctured, with scattered setae beside the eyes. The antennae are reddish-brown. The pronotum is olive-green and shows, albeit very faintly, a linear median longitudinal groove. The elytra are similarly coloured and sculpted as in related species Microserica lineolata and Microserica nigrolineata.
