= Microserica sitoliensis =

Scientific classification
- Kingdom: Animalia
- Phylum: Arthropoda
- Clade: Pancrustacea
- Class: Insecta
- Order: Coleoptera
- Suborder: Polyphaga
- Infraorder: Scarabaeiformia
- Family: Scarabaeidae
- Genus: Microserica
- Species: M. sitoliensis

Binomial name
- Microserica sitoliensis Moser, 1922

Species of beetle

Microserica sitoliensis is a species of beetle of the family Scarabaeidae. It is found in Indonesia (Nias).

== Description ==
Adults reach a length of about 4.5 mm. They are very similar to Microserica pusilla, but differs in the shape of the pronotum, in that the anterior angles are less pronounced. The forceps is also shaped differently.
