= Microserica neosimplex =

Scientific classification
- Kingdom: Animalia
- Phylum: Arthropoda
- Class: Insecta
- Order: Coleoptera
- Suborder: Polyphaga
- Infraorder: Scarabaeiformia
- Family: Scarabaeidae
- Genus: Microserica
- Species: M. neosimplex

Binomial name
- Microserica neosimplex Ahrens, Lukic & Liu, 2023

Species of beetle

Microserica neosimplex is a species of beetle of the family Scarabaeidae. It is found in Thailand and China (Yunnan).

== Description ==
Adults reach a length of about 4.3–5.2 mm. They have a reddish brown, oval body. The ventral surface (including abdomen, frons, anterior central margin of the pronotum and elytral margins) is blackish brown, while the antennal club and legs are yellowish brown. The dorsal surface is dull, sometimes partly iridescent shiny, and nearly glabrous.

== Etymology ==
The species name is derived from Greek neo (meaning new) and the species name simplex and refers to the similarity to Microserica simplex.
