= Microserica neglecta =

Scientific classification
- Kingdom: Animalia
- Phylum: Arthropoda
- Clade: Pancrustacea
- Class: Insecta
- Order: Coleoptera
- Suborder: Polyphaga
- Infraorder: Scarabaeiformia
- Family: Scarabaeidae
- Genus: Microserica
- Species: M. neglecta

Binomial name
- Microserica neglecta Moser, 1915

Species of beetle

Microserica neglecta is a species of beetle of the family Scarabaeidae. It is found in Indonesia (Sumatra).

== Description ==
Adults reach a length of about 5–6 mm. They are similar to Microserica malaccensis, but easily distinguished from it by the setae of its pronotum. In that species, in addition to the setae on the lateral margins and anterior margin, there are only a few setae in the anterior corners of the pronotum. In M. neglecta however, setae are also present on the anterior half of the disc. Furthermore, M. malaccensis is uniformly coloured, with the elytra bearing a large oval yellowish-brown spot at the base. M. neglecta however, may be entirely black on the upper surface, have a very small basal spot on the elytra, or a spot of the same shape and size as in M. malaccensis. However, the colour of this spot is not yellowish-brown, but reddish. The legs are more or less brownish.
