= Microserica sexlamellata =

Scientific classification
- Kingdom: Animalia
- Phylum: Arthropoda
- Clade: Pancrustacea
- Class: Insecta
- Order: Coleoptera
- Suborder: Polyphaga
- Infraorder: Scarabaeiformia
- Family: Scarabaeidae
- Genus: Microserica
- Species: M. sexlamellata

Binomial name
- Microserica sexlamellata Moser, 1913

Species of beetle

Microserica sexlamellata is a species of beetle of the family Scarabaeidae. It is found in Indonesia (Java).

== Description ==
Adults reach a length of about 6 mm (0.24 in). They are Similar in colouration to Microserica sexflabellata, but somewhat larger and longer. The intervals on the elytra are quite strongly convex and the punctures of the elytra and pygidium are provided with tiny setae. Several longer setae are present before the posterior margin of the latter. The thorax is longitudinally grooved in the middle, and a row of setae is located on each side of the groove. Each abdominal segment bears a transverse row of setae in the middle.
