= Microserica paravicula =

Scientific classification
- Kingdom: Animalia
- Phylum: Arthropoda
- Class: Insecta
- Order: Coleoptera
- Suborder: Polyphaga
- Infraorder: Scarabaeiformia
- Family: Scarabaeidae
- Genus: Microserica
- Species: M. paravicula

Binomial name
- Microserica paravicula Ahrens, Lukic & Liu, 2023

Species of beetle

Microserica paravicula is a species of beetle of the family Scarabaeidae. It is found in China (Fujian, Guangdong, Guangxi).

== Description ==
Adults reach a length of about 5.6–6.2 mm. They have a yellowish brown, oval body, with the lateral intervals, frons, two large pairs of spots on the pronotum and multiple dots on the elytra are brown. The dorsal surface is dull and nearly glabrous.

== Etymology ==
The species name is derived from Greek para (meaning false) and the species name avicula and refers to the similarity to Microserica avicula.
