= Microserica batoensis =

Scientific classification
- Kingdom: Animalia
- Phylum: Arthropoda
- Clade: Pancrustacea
- Class: Insecta
- Order: Coleoptera
- Suborder: Polyphaga
- Infraorder: Scarabaeiformia
- Family: Scarabaeidae
- Genus: Microserica
- Species: M. batoensis

Binomial name
- Microserica batoensis Moser, 1924

Species of beetle

Microserica batoensis is a species of beetle of the family Scarabaeidae. It is found in Indonesia (Batu Islands).

== Description ==
Adults reach a length of about 6 mm (0.24 in). They are similar to Microserica striola, but slightly larger, the antennal fan of the males is shorter, and the hind tibiae are somewhat more shortened.
