= Microserica virgata =

Scientific classification
- Kingdom: Animalia
- Phylum: Arthropoda
- Clade: Pancrustacea
- Class: Insecta
- Order: Coleoptera
- Suborder: Polyphaga
- Infraorder: Scarabaeiformia
- Family: Scarabaeidae
- Genus: Microserica
- Species: M. virgata

Binomial name
- Microserica virgata Moser, 1915

Species of beetle

Microserica virgata is a species of beetle of the family Scarabaeidae. It is found in Malaysia (Sabah).

== Description ==
Adults reach a length of about 5.5 mm. They are similar to Microserica nigrolineata, but the pronotum is green in the anterior part and reddish posteriorly. The head is quite widely punctured and the frons is dull, with some setae beside the eyes. The pronotum has fine, minutely setate punctures and the lateral margins, like the anterior margin (except for the middle), are covered with strong setae. The elytra are punctured in the blackish striae, and the punctures are minutely setate. The weakly convex intervals are brown and unpunctured and the lateral margins and the posterior margin of the elytra are broadly black.
