= Microserica lugundriensis =

Scientific classification
- Kingdom: Animalia
- Phylum: Arthropoda
- Class: Insecta
- Order: Coleoptera
- Suborder: Polyphaga
- Infraorder: Scarabaeiformia
- Family: Scarabaeidae
- Genus: Microserica
- Species: M. lugundriensis

Binomial name
- Microserica lugundriensis Ahrens, 2001

Species of beetle

Microserica lugundriensis is a species of beetle of the family Scarabaeidae. It is found in Indonesia (Nias).

== Description ==
Adults reach a length of about 6.5–6.7 mm. All external phenotypic characteristics are identical to Microserica splendidula, and the species can only be distinguished by its genitalia.

== Etymology ==
The species is named after its type locality, Lugundri.
