= Microserica variicollis =

Scientific classification
- Kingdom: Animalia
- Phylum: Arthropoda
- Clade: Pancrustacea
- Class: Insecta
- Order: Coleoptera
- Suborder: Polyphaga
- Infraorder: Scarabaeiformia
- Family: Scarabaeidae
- Genus: Microserica
- Species: M. variicollis

Binomial name
- Microserica variicollis Moser, 1922

Species of beetle

Microserica variicollis is a species of beetle of the family Scarabaeidae. It is found in Indonesia (Sumatra).

== Description ==
Adults reach a length of about 4.5 mm. They are very similar to Microserica singalangia but the lateral margins of the pronotum are more curved, and the pronotum is therefore somewhat tapered posteriorly.
