= Microserica splendida =

Scientific classification
- Kingdom: Animalia
- Phylum: Arthropoda
- Clade: Pancrustacea
- Class: Insecta
- Order: Coleoptera
- Suborder: Polyphaga
- Infraorder: Scarabaeiformia
- Family: Scarabaeidae
- Genus: Microserica
- Species: M. splendida

Binomial name
- Microserica splendida Moser, 1924

Species of beetle

Microserica splendida is a species of beetle of the family Scarabaeidae. It is found in Indonesia (Sumatra).

== Description ==
Adults reach a length of about 4.5 mm (0.18 in). They are similar to Microserica variicornis, and varies in colouration just like it and related species. However, the antennae of the males are shorter than in variicollis, with the first segment somewhat shortened.
