= Microserica dansalana =

Scientific classification
- Kingdom: Animalia
- Phylum: Arthropoda
- Clade: Pancrustacea
- Class: Insecta
- Order: Coleoptera
- Suborder: Polyphaga
- Infraorder: Scarabaeiformia
- Family: Scarabaeidae
- Genus: Microserica
- Species: M. dansalana

Binomial name
- Microserica dansalana Moser, 1922

Species of beetle

Microserica dansalana is a species of beetle of the family Scarabaeidae. It is found in the Philippines (Mindanao).

== Description ==
Adults reach a length of about 5 mm. They are very similar to Microserica abbreviata, but with different antennae. They are rufous and opaque, with the front and middle of the pronotum green. The head is sparsely punctate and the antennae are reddish-yellow. The pronotum has ciliated sides and is moderately densely punctate.
