= Microserica nigrosuturata =

Scientific classification
- Kingdom: Animalia
- Phylum: Arthropoda
- Clade: Pancrustacea
- Class: Insecta
- Order: Coleoptera
- Suborder: Polyphaga
- Infraorder: Scarabaeiformia
- Family: Scarabaeidae
- Genus: Microserica
- Species: M. nigrosuturata

Binomial name
- Microserica nigrosuturata Moser, 1911

Species of beetle

Microserica nigrosuturata is a species of beetle of the family Scarabaeidae. It is found in Malaysia (Sarawak).

== Description ==
Adults reach a length of about 7.5 mm. The upper surface is mostly dull. The frons has some erect setae. The pronotum and scutellum are coulored and sculpted in the same way as in Microserica moultoni. The elytra are punctate-striate, the punctate striae are black, and the spaces between them are weakly convex. The black colouration of the sutural rib and the fourth rib creates a broad suture band and a broad discoidal band, between which a narrow black dotted line is located. The fifth rib is also black at its base.
