= Microserica semitecta =

Scientific classification
- Kingdom: Animalia
- Phylum: Arthropoda
- Class: Insecta
- Order: Coleoptera
- Suborder: Polyphaga
- Infraorder: Scarabaeiformia
- Family: Scarabaeidae
- Genus: Microserica
- Species: M. semitecta

Binomial name
- Microserica semitecta Brenske, 1899

Species of beetle

Microserica semitecta is a species of beetle of the family Scarabaeidae. It is found in Indonesia (Kalimantan).

== Description ==
Adults reach a length of about 5.8 mm. They are very similar to Microserica magnifica due to the striated elytra. They are dull and strongly opalescent. The head is green and finely punctate. The pronotum is not projected at the anterior margin, here with a straight row of strong setae, the sides almost straight. The elytra are punctate in rows, the intervals distinctly raised, the 2nd and 4th somewhat more so, reddish-yellow in color, only the lateral margin, the apex and part of the suture darkened. The underside is shimmering greenish-blue.
