= Microserica allovarians =

Scientific classification
- Kingdom: Animalia
- Phylum: Arthropoda
- Class: Insecta
- Order: Coleoptera
- Suborder: Polyphaga
- Infraorder: Scarabaeiformia
- Family: Scarabaeidae
- Genus: Microserica
- Species: M. allovarians

Binomial name
- Microserica allovarians Ahrens, Lukic & Liu, 2023

Species of beetle

Microserica allovarians is a species of beetle of the family Scarabaeidae. It is found in Myanmar and Thailand.

== Description ==
Adults reach a length of about 4.6–4.9 mm. They have a dark brown, oval body. The antennal club and tarsi are yellowish brown and the dorsal surface is dull, sometimes partly iridescent shiny, and nearly glabrous.

== Etymology ==
The species name is derived from Greek allo (meaning other) and the species name varians and refers to the similarity to Microserica varians.
