= Microserica parasimplex =

Scientific classification
- Kingdom: Animalia
- Phylum: Arthropoda
- Class: Insecta
- Order: Coleoptera
- Suborder: Polyphaga
- Infraorder: Scarabaeiformia
- Family: Scarabaeidae
- Genus: Microserica
- Species: M. parasimplex

Binomial name
- Microserica parasimplex Ahrens, Lukic & Liu, 2023

Species of beetle

Microserica parasimplex is a species of beetle of the family Scarabaeidae. It is found in Laos and Thailand.

== Description ==
Adults reach a length of about 4.7–5.2 mm. They have a yellowish brown, oval body, the frons and part of the pronotum with some iridescent-greenish shine. The antennal club is brown at the apex. The dorsal surface is iridescent, partly dull and nearly glabrous.

== Etymology ==
The species name is derived from Greek para (meaning false) and the species name simplex and refers to the similarity to Microserica simplex.
