= Microserica samarana =

Scientific classification
- Kingdom: Animalia
- Phylum: Arthropoda
- Class: Insecta
- Order: Coleoptera
- Suborder: Polyphaga
- Infraorder: Scarabaeiformia
- Family: Scarabaeidae
- Genus: Microserica
- Species: M. samarana

Binomial name
- Microserica samarana Brenske, 1899

Species of beetle

Microserica samarana is a species of beetle of the family Scarabaeidae. It is found in the Philippines (Samar).

== Description ==
Adults reach a length of about 4 mm. They are very similar to Microserica negrosiana, but the pronotum is longer, the elytra are less distinctly ribbed, the striae are more broadly punctate and the intervals are not unpunctate and barely raised. The colouration is variable. The head and pronotum are dark green, the elytra are reddish-brown with a dark suture and a broader black lateral margin, which widens so that only two elongated spots at the base remain red, or the elytra are entirely dark, silky-shimmering, in which case the head and pronotum also remain dark green. Only the abdomen is brownish.
