= Microserica iridicolor =

Scientific classification
- Kingdom: Animalia
- Phylum: Arthropoda
- Clade: Pancrustacea
- Class: Insecta
- Order: Coleoptera
- Suborder: Polyphaga
- Infraorder: Scarabaeiformia
- Family: Scarabaeidae
- Genus: Microserica
- Species: M. iridicolor

Binomial name
- Microserica iridicolor Moser, 1922

Species of beetle

Microserica iridicolor is a species of beetle of the family Scarabaeidae. It is found in Indonesia (Sumatra).

== Description ==
Adults reach a length of about 5 mm. They are very similar to Microserica singalangia but is slightly larger and has a strong iridescence on its upper surface. Furthermore, the pronotum is not weakly broadened posteriorly. Instead, its lateral margins are parallel and slightly sinuate. The spaces between the rows of punctures on the elytra are almost flat.
