= Microserica minuscula =

Scientific classification
- Kingdom: Animalia
- Phylum: Arthropoda
- Clade: Pancrustacea
- Class: Insecta
- Order: Coleoptera
- Suborder: Polyphaga
- Infraorder: Scarabaeiformia
- Family: Scarabaeidae
- Genus: Microserica
- Species: M. minuscula

Binomial name
- Microserica minuscula Moser, 1915

Species of beetle

Microserica minuscula is a species of beetle of the family Scarabaeidae. It is found in Malaysia (Sabah).

== Description ==
Adults reach a length of about 4-4.5 mm. The head is green and widely punctate, and the frons and the posterior part of the clypeus are dull. The antennae are yellowish-brown. The pronotum is similarly shaped to that of related species (such as Microserica nigrolineata), but the sides appear somewhat more strongly curved upwards before the middle. The colouration of the pronotum is green, while the posterior part has a more or less reddish sheen. The elytra are punctate in the blackish striae, while the weakly convex, yellowish-brown intervals are almost unpunctate. The suture, the lateral margins, and the posterior margin are also blackish.
