= Microserica kolambugana =

Scientific classification
- Kingdom: Animalia
- Phylum: Arthropoda
- Clade: Pancrustacea
- Class: Insecta
- Order: Coleoptera
- Suborder: Polyphaga
- Infraorder: Scarabaeiformia
- Family: Scarabaeidae
- Genus: Microserica
- Species: M. kolambugana

Binomial name
- Microserica kolambugana Moser, 1922

Species of beetle

Microserica kolambugana is a species of beetle of the family Scarabaeidae. It is found in the Philippines (Mindanao).

== Description ==
Adults reach a length of about 5 mm. They are similar to Microserica viridifrons. They are opaque and red above. The frons is green and the anterior part of the pronotum is greenish. The underside is dark. The head is moderately densely punctate. The pronotum has setose margins and the surface is subtly punctate.
