= Microserica banlaoana =

Scientific classification
- Kingdom: Animalia
- Phylum: Arthropoda
- Clade: Pancrustacea
- Class: Insecta
- Order: Coleoptera
- Suborder: Polyphaga
- Infraorder: Scarabaeiformia
- Family: Scarabaeidae
- Genus: Microserica
- Species: M. banlaoana

Binomial name
- Microserica banlaoana Ahrens, Lukic & Liu, 2023

Species of beetle

Microserica banlaoana is a species of beetle of the family Scarabaeidae. It is found in China (Yunnan).

== Description ==
Adults reach a length of about 9 mm. They have a reddish brown, oval body. The antennae are yellow. The dorsal and ventral surfaces are dull, but the labroclypeus and anterior frons are shiny. Also, the dorsal surface is glabrous.

== Etymology ==
The species name is derived from the name of its type locality, Banlao.
