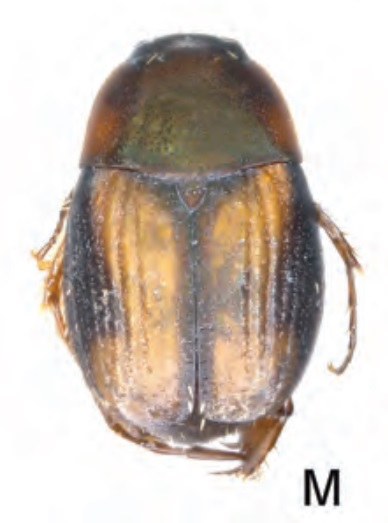

Scientific classification
- Kingdom: Animalia
- Phylum: Arthropoda
- Class: Insecta
- Order: Coleoptera
- Suborder: Polyphaga
- Infraorder: Scarabaeiformia
- Family: Scarabaeidae
- Genus: Anomioserica
- Species: A. maesi

Binomial name
- Anomioserica maesi Ahrens & Fabrizi, 2016

= Anomioserica maesi =

Species of beetle

Anomioserica maesi is a species of beetle of the family Scarabaeidae. It is found in southern India (Nilgiri Hills).

== Description ==
Adults reach a length of about 3.6 mm. They have a dark brown, oval body, the head and pronotum with a greenish shine. The sides of the pronotum are lighter and the legs and elytra are yellowish brown, the latter with black margins and a dark long lateral spot. The dorsal surface is dull and glabrous, except for some white setae on the head and elytra.

== Etymology ==
The species is named for Jean Michel Maes, who provided the specimens to the authors.
