= Microserica nigra =

Scientific classification
- Kingdom: Animalia
- Phylum: Arthropoda
- Class: Insecta
- Order: Coleoptera
- Suborder: Polyphaga
- Infraorder: Scarabaeiformia
- Family: Scarabaeidae
- Genus: Microserica
- Species: M. nigra

Binomial name
- Microserica nigra (Brenske, 1899)

Synonyms
- Neoserica nigra Brenske, 1899; Microserica globula Brenske, 1899

Species of beetle

Microserica nigra is a species of beetle of the family Scarabaeidae. It is found in Myanmar and Thailand.

== Description ==
Adults reach a length of about 5.3–6.4 mm. They have a black, broad, short oval, strongly convex body. The surface is dull (except for the legs and the anterior labroclypeus), glabrous and partly iridescent shiny.
