= Microserica septemflabellata =

Scientific classification
- Kingdom: Animalia
- Phylum: Arthropoda
- Clade: Pancrustacea
- Class: Insecta
- Order: Coleoptera
- Suborder: Polyphaga
- Infraorder: Scarabaeiformia
- Family: Scarabaeidae
- Genus: Microserica
- Species: M. septemflabellata

Binomial name
- Microserica septemflabellata Moser, 1916

Species of beetle

Microserica septemflabellata is a species of beetle of the family Scarabaeidae. It is found in Indonesia (Sumatra).

== Description ==
Adults reach a length of about 6 mm. They are yellowish-brown, dull and weakly opalescent. The head is green and the lateral margins of the elytra, a median transverse band, and an apical band are black or blackish-brown. The head is sparsely punctate, the frons is dull and the antennae are reddish-yellow. The pronotum is moderately densely punctate and the anterior margin and the lateral margins are setate. Occasionally, two darkened spots are found in the middle of the disc. The elytra are slightly grooved and strongly punctured in the furrows, these punctures are covered with tiny setae, while the slightly convex intervals are free of punctures.
