= Microserica corporaali =

Scientific classification
- Kingdom: Animalia
- Phylum: Arthropoda
- Clade: Pancrustacea
- Class: Insecta
- Order: Coleoptera
- Suborder: Polyphaga
- Infraorder: Scarabaeiformia
- Family: Scarabaeidae
- Genus: Microserica
- Species: M. corporaali

Binomial name
- Microserica corporaali Moser, 1917

Species of beetle

Microserica corporaali is a species of beetle of the family Scarabaeidae. It is found in Indonesia (Sumatra).

== Description ==
Adults reach a length of about 5.5 mm. They are shiny and yellowish-brown above, with a bluish sheen. The underside is blackish-brown and the abdomen is somewhat dull. The head is blackish-green and finely punctate. Behind the suture and on the clypeus are several strong, bristle-like punctures. The pronotum is quite densely and finely punctate and the scutellum is blackish-green and densely punctate. The elytra have rows of punctures, with the intervals only very weakly convex and sparsely punctured. The suture and the lateral margins of the elytra are blackish.
