= Anomioserica =

Scientific classification
- Kingdom: Animalia
- Phylum: Arthropoda
- Clade: Pancrustacea
- Class: Insecta
- Order: Coleoptera
- Suborder: Polyphaga
- Infraorder: Scarabaeiformia
- Family: Scarabaeidae
- Subfamily: Sericinae
- Tribe: Sericini
- Genus: Anomioserica; Arrow, 1946

Genus of leaf beetles

Anomioserica is a genus of beetles belonging to the family Scarabaeidae.

== Species ==
- Anomioserica flavipes Arrow, 1946
- Anomioserica kotagiriensis Ahrens & Fabrizi, 2016
- Anomioserica liliputana (Moser, 1916)
- Anomioserica maesi Ahrens & Fabrizi, 2016
- Anomioserica symmetrica Ahrens & Fabrizi, 2016
- Anomioserica tarsalis (Frey, 1960)
