= Anomioserica flavipes =

Scientific classification
- Kingdom: Animalia
- Phylum: Arthropoda
- Class: Insecta
- Order: Coleoptera
- Suborder: Polyphaga
- Infraorder: Scarabaeiformia
- Family: Scarabaeidae
- Genus: Anomioserica
- Species: A. flavipes

Binomial name
- Anomioserica flavipes Arrow, 1946

Species of beetle

Anomioserica flavipes is a species of beetle of the family Scarabaeidae. It is found in India (Tamil Nadu, Kerala, Karnataka).

== Description ==
Adults reach a length of about 4.3 mm. They have a yellowish brown, oval body. The anterior disc of the pronotum, the sutural interval and a large spot on the elytra are all dark brown to blackish, partly with a greenish shine. The dorsal surface is dull and glabrous, except for some yellow setae on the head and elytra.
