= Microserica bifasciata =

Scientific classification
- Kingdom: Animalia
- Phylum: Arthropoda
- Class: Insecta
- Order: Coleoptera
- Suborder: Polyphaga
- Infraorder: Scarabaeiformia
- Family: Scarabaeidae
- Genus: Microserica
- Species: M. bifasciata

Binomial name
- Microserica bifasciata Ahrens, 2003

Species of beetle

Microserica bifasciata is a species of beetle of the family Scarabaeidae. It is found in Indonesia (Sumatra).

== Description ==
Adults reach a length of about 6.9 mm. They have a dark brown, oval body, partly with a greenish or iridescent shine. The pronotum and anterior third of the elytra is reddish brown, the latter with two yellowish transversal bands. The antennae are brown. The dorsal surface (except for the shiny labroclypeus and tibia) is dull and glabrous.
