= Microserica macrophylla =

Scientific classification
- Kingdom: Animalia
- Phylum: Arthropoda
- Clade: Pancrustacea
- Class: Insecta
- Order: Coleoptera
- Suborder: Polyphaga
- Infraorder: Scarabaeiformia
- Family: Scarabaeidae
- Genus: Microserica
- Species: M. macrophylla

Binomial name
- Microserica macrophylla Moser, 1914

Species of beetle

Microserica macrophylla is a species of beetle of the family Scarabaeidae. It is found in Indonesia (Simeulue).

== Description ==
Adults reach a length of about 6 mm. They are uniformly dark brown. The frons has several setae next to the eyes. The pronotum only indistinctly reveals a dense, abundant punctation due to the tomentation. The lateral margins are covered with erect setae. On the elytra have punctures with tiny setae. Very occasionally, longer, crescent-shaped setae are found.
