= Microserica heptaphylla =

Scientific classification
- Kingdom: Animalia
- Phylum: Arthropoda
- Class: Insecta
- Order: Coleoptera
- Suborder: Polyphaga
- Infraorder: Scarabaeiformia
- Family: Scarabaeidae
- Genus: Microserica
- Species: M. heptaphylla

Binomial name
- Microserica heptaphylla Frey, 1972

Species of beetle

Microserica heptaphylla is a species of beetle of the family Scarabaeidae. It is found in Laos, Thailand and Vietnam.

== Description ==
Adults reach a length of about 4.1–5.6 mm. They have a broad, oval, moderately convex body. They are yellowish-brown with a dark head or uniformly blackish-brown, sometimes with dark coloration at the base of the elytra and sometimes with the lateral margins of the pronotum lightened. The surface is dull (partly with a greenish iridescent sheen) and glabrous, except for the legs and the anterior labroclypeus.
