= Microserica shelfordi =

Scientific classification
- Kingdom: Animalia
- Phylum: Arthropoda
- Class: Insecta
- Order: Coleoptera
- Suborder: Polyphaga
- Infraorder: Scarabaeiformia
- Family: Scarabaeidae
- Genus: Microserica
- Species: M. shelfordi

Binomial name
- Microserica shelfordi Arrow, 1946

Species of beetle

Microserica shelfordi is a species of beetle of the family Scarabaeidae. It is found in Malaysia (Sarawak).

== Description ==
Adults reach a length of about 7 mm. They are bright red or rust-red above and beneath, with the elytra usually black except for a narrow red basal margin. The antennae and femora are bright yellow and the tibiae and tarsi red.
