= Microserica thagatana =

Scientific classification
- Kingdom: Animalia
- Phylum: Arthropoda
- Class: Insecta
- Order: Coleoptera
- Suborder: Polyphaga
- Infraorder: Scarabaeiformia
- Family: Scarabaeidae
- Genus: Microserica
- Species: M. thagatana

Binomial name
- Microserica thagatana (Brenske, 1899)

Synonyms
- Autoserica thagatana Brenske, 1899

Species of beetle

Microserica thagatana is a species of beetle of the family Scarabaeidae. It is found in Myanmar.

== Description ==
Adults reach a length of about 4.3–5 mm. They have an uniformly black, broad, oval, moderately convex body. The surface is dull (partly with a greenish sheen) and glabrous, except for the legs and the anterior labroclypeus.
