= Microserica confusa =

Scientific classification
- Kingdom: Animalia
- Phylum: Arthropoda
- Clade: Pancrustacea
- Class: Insecta
- Order: Coleoptera
- Suborder: Polyphaga
- Infraorder: Scarabaeiformia
- Family: Scarabaeidae
- Genus: Microserica
- Species: M. confusa

Binomial name
- Microserica confusa Moser, 1916

Species of beetle

Microserica confusa is a species of beetle of the family Scarabaeidae. It is found in Indonesia (Sumatra).

== Description ==
Adults reach a length of about 5.5 mm. They are reddish-yellow, the frons is green and the suture and the sides of the elytra are darkened. The frons is finely punctate, with a row of setae behind the suture. The pronotum is moderately densely covered with fine punctures and the anterior margin and the lateral margins are setate.
