= Microserica singaporeana =

Scientific classification
- Kingdom: Animalia
- Phylum: Arthropoda
- Clade: Pancrustacea
- Class: Insecta
- Order: Coleoptera
- Suborder: Polyphaga
- Infraorder: Scarabaeiformia
- Family: Scarabaeidae
- Genus: Microserica
- Species: M. singaporeana

Binomial name
- Microserica singaporeana Moser, 1921

Synonyms
- Microserica vulnerata Arrow, 1946

Species of beetle

Microserica singaporeana is a species of beetle of the family Scarabaeidae. It is found in Malaysia and Singapore.

== Description ==
Adults reach a length of about 4.8–4.9 mm. They have a broad, oval, moderately convex body. They are black, with the pronotum and elytra more or less extensively dark brown to reddish-brown. The surface is dull (partly with a greenish iridescent or coppery sheen) and glabrous, except for the legs and the anterior labroclypeus.
