= Microserica hobokoana =

Scientific classification
- Kingdom: Animalia
- Phylum: Arthropoda
- Clade: Pancrustacea
- Class: Insecta
- Order: Coleoptera
- Suborder: Polyphaga
- Infraorder: Scarabaeiformia
- Family: Scarabaeidae
- Genus: Microserica
- Species: M. hobokoana

Binomial name
- Microserica hobokoana Moser, 1922

Species of beetle

Microserica hobokoana is a species of beetle of the family Scarabaeidae. It is found in Indonesia (Sumatra).

== Description ==
Adults reach a length of about 5.5 mm. They have a black, opaque, oblong-oval body. The pronotum is moderately densely punctate, with very minute setae, but with strong setae anteriorly. The elytra are slightly sulcate, moderately densely punctate, and covered with very short setae, while the sides of the elytra have fairly strong setae.
