= Microserica dohrni =

Scientific classification
- Kingdom: Animalia
- Phylum: Arthropoda
- Class: Insecta
- Order: Coleoptera
- Suborder: Polyphaga
- Infraorder: Scarabaeiformia
- Family: Scarabaeidae
- Genus: Microserica
- Species: M. dohrni

Binomial name
- Microserica dohrni Brenske, 1899

Synonyms
- Microserica recondita Brenske, 1899

Species of beetle

Microserica dohrni is a species of beetle of the family Scarabaeidae. It is found in Indonesia (Sumatra) and Malaysia.

== Description ==
Adults reach a length of about 4-4.3 mm. The pronotum is somewhat shortened and has a distinctly impressed line along its midpoint. The intervals on the elytra are alternately more raised and more strongly ribbed. The pygidium is pointed. Specimens may differ in their markings, but have a strong opalescent sheen above and a silky sheen below. The head and pronotum are green, the latter reddish-yellow at the base, or entirely dark green. The reddish-yellow elytra have a dark lateral margin with a broadened center.
