= Microserica globulosa =

Scientific classification
- Kingdom: Animalia
- Phylum: Arthropoda
- Clade: Pancrustacea
- Class: Insecta
- Order: Coleoptera
- Suborder: Polyphaga
- Infraorder: Scarabaeiformia
- Family: Scarabaeidae
- Genus: Microserica
- Species: M. globulosa

Binomial name
- Microserica globulosa Moser, 1915

Species of beetle

Microserica globulosa is a species of beetle of the family Scarabaeidae. It is found in Myanmar and Thailand.

== Description ==
Adults reach a length of about 4.3–5.1 mm. They have a broad, oval, moderately convex body. They are uniformly black or (very rarely) brown. The surface is dull (sometimes with a greenish or coppery iridescent sheen) and glabrous, except for the legs and the anterior labroclypeus.
