= Microserica pleophylla =

Scientific classification
- Kingdom: Animalia
- Phylum: Arthropoda
- Class: Insecta
- Order: Coleoptera
- Suborder: Polyphaga
- Infraorder: Scarabaeiformia
- Family: Scarabaeidae
- Genus: Microserica
- Species: M. pleophylla

Binomial name
- Microserica pleophylla (Burmeister, 1855)

Synonyms
- Serica pleophylla Burmeister, 1855

Species of beetle

Microserica pleophylla is a species of beetle of the family Scarabaeidae. It is found in Indonesia (Java).

== Description ==
Adults reach a length of about 4.5 mm. The head and pronotum are dark, the elytra brownish-red and opalescent, and the lateral margin and suture (but not the base) blackish. The striae are strongly raised.
