= Microserica fulvovittata =

Scientific classification
- Kingdom: Animalia
- Phylum: Arthropoda
- Clade: Pancrustacea
- Class: Insecta
- Order: Coleoptera
- Suborder: Polyphaga
- Infraorder: Scarabaeiformia
- Family: Scarabaeidae
- Genus: Microserica
- Species: M. fulvovittata

Binomial name
- Microserica fulvovittata Moser, 1911

Species of beetle

Microserica fulvovittata is a species of beetle of the family Scarabaeidae. It is found in Malaysia (Sarawak).

== Description ==
Adults reach a length of about 6 mm. The upper surface is mostly dull. The head is black and the pronotum is yellowish-brown, with a black transverse spot in front of the scutellum, the anterior margin of which forms an anteriorly opening arc. The lateral margins are setate, just like the elytra. The latter are punctate-striate, with the spaces between them only very slightly convex. The colour of the elytra is golden yellow, with the anterior and posterior margins, as well as the posterior half of the suture, black. The sides have a broad black marginal band, which, however, is interrupted before the middle, with only the outermost narrow fringe remaining black.
