= Microserica calapana =

Scientific classification
- Kingdom: Animalia
- Phylum: Arthropoda
- Clade: Pancrustacea
- Class: Insecta
- Order: Coleoptera
- Suborder: Polyphaga
- Infraorder: Scarabaeiformia
- Family: Scarabaeidae
- Genus: Microserica
- Species: M. calapana

Binomial name
- Microserica calapana Moser, 1922

Species of beetle

Microserica calapana is a species of beetle of the family Scarabaeidae. It is found in the Philippines (Mindoro).

== Description ==
Adults reach a length of about 6 mm. They are opaque and red above and dark beneath. The pronotum often has green spots. The head is sparsely punctate and the antennae are reddish-yellow. The pronotum is ciliated on the sides.
