= Microserica oceana =

Scientific classification
- Kingdom: Animalia
- Phylum: Arthropoda
- Class: Insecta
- Order: Coleoptera
- Suborder: Polyphaga
- Infraorder: Scarabaeiformia
- Family: Scarabaeidae
- Genus: Microserica
- Species: M. oceana

Binomial name
- Microserica oceana (Brenske, 1894)

Synonyms
- Serica oceana Brenske, 1894

Species of beetle

Microserica oceana is a species of beetle of the family Scarabaeidae. It is found in the Philippines.

== Description ==
Adults reach a length of about 6 mm. They are reddish-yellow and dull. The punctures on the frons and thorax are not visible under the tomentum. There are scattered setae along the lateral margin of the thorax and the scutellum is sparsely punctured. The elytra are punctate-striate with raised, less punctate spaces. The margin is densely fringed.
