= Microserica caiyangheana =

Scientific classification
- Kingdom: Animalia
- Phylum: Arthropoda
- Class: Insecta
- Order: Coleoptera
- Suborder: Polyphaga
- Infraorder: Scarabaeiformia
- Family: Scarabaeidae
- Genus: Microserica
- Species: M. caiyangheana

Binomial name
- Microserica caiyangheana Ahrens, Lukic & Liu, 2023

Species of beetle

Microserica caiyangheana is a species of beetle of the family Scarabaeidae. It is found in China (Yunnan).

== Description ==
Adults reach a length of about 5.4–5.6 mm. They have a yellowish brown, oval body, with the lateral intervals, frons, two large pairs of spots on the pronotum and multiple dots on the elytra brown. The dorsal surface is dull and nearly glabrous.

== Etymology ==
The species name is derived from the type locality, the Caiyanghe River.
