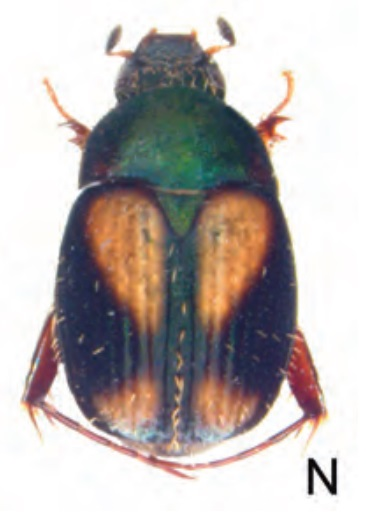

Scientific classification
- Kingdom: Animalia
- Phylum: Arthropoda
- Class: Insecta
- Order: Coleoptera
- Suborder: Polyphaga
- Infraorder: Scarabaeiformia
- Family: Scarabaeidae
- Genus: Anomioserica
- Species: A. symmetrica

Binomial name
- Anomioserica symmetrica Ahrens & Fabrizi, 2016

= Anomioserica symmetrica =

Species of beetle

Anomioserica symmetrica is a species of beetle of the family Scarabaeidae. It is found in southern India (Tamil Nadu, Nilgiri Hills).

== Description ==
Adults reach a length of about 3.8–4.4 mm. They have a dark brown, oval body, the head and pronotum with an iridescent greenish shine. The elytra are yellowish brown with black margins and a dark long lateral spot. The dorsal surface is dull, with dirty-white, short, scale-like setae on the head, elytra and ventral surface.

== Etymology ==
The species name is derived from Latin symmetricus and refers to the symmetric parameres of the species.
