= Microserica viridana =

Scientific classification
- Kingdom: Animalia
- Phylum: Arthropoda
- Class: Insecta
- Order: Coleoptera
- Suborder: Polyphaga
- Infraorder: Scarabaeiformia
- Family: Scarabaeidae
- Genus: Microserica
- Species: M. viridana

Binomial name
- Microserica viridana Brenske, 1899

Species of beetle

Microserica viridana is a species of beetle of the family Scarabaeidae. It is found in Indonesia (Sumatra).

== Description ==
Adults reach a length of about 4 mm. They are dull, with a slight opalescent sheen. The pronotum is not projecting forward in the middle at the anterior margin, the anterior angles distinctly projecting, the lateral margin straight, symmetrically widening posteriorly and laterally. The elytra are densely but irregularly punctate in the striae, the intervals are unpunctate and slightly raised.
