= Microserica arorogensis =

Scientific classification
- Kingdom: Animalia
- Phylum: Arthropoda
- Clade: Pancrustacea
- Class: Insecta
- Order: Coleoptera
- Suborder: Polyphaga
- Infraorder: Scarabaeiformia
- Family: Scarabaeidae
- Genus: Microserica
- Species: M. arorogensis

Binomial name
- Microserica arorogensis Moser, 1922

Species of beetle

Microserica arorogensis is a species of beetle of the family Scarabaeidae. It is found in the Philippines (Masbate).

== Description ==
Adults reach a length of about 4-4.5 mm. The head, pronotum and scutellum are more or less reddish, the elytra reddish with the sides blackish, and the underside is dark or greenish-brown. The head is medium densely punctate and the antennae are reddish-yellow.
