= Microserica biapoensis =

Scientific classification
- Kingdom: Animalia
- Phylum: Arthropoda
- Class: Insecta
- Order: Coleoptera
- Suborder: Polyphaga
- Infraorder: Scarabaeiformia
- Family: Scarabaeidae
- Genus: Microserica
- Species: M. biapoensis

Binomial name
- Microserica biapoensis Ahrens, 2002

Species of beetle

Microserica biapoensis is a species of beetle of the family Scarabaeidae. It is found in Myanmar.

== Description ==
Adults reach a length of about 5.4–5.6 mm. They have a moderately broad, oval, moderately convex body. The coloration is variable, sometimes uniformly black or with the elytra yellowish-brown with a dark suture interval and sides. The surface is dull (partly with a greenish sheen) and glabrous, except for the legs and the anterior labroclypeus.

== Etymology ==
The species is named after its type locality Carin-Cheba (Bia-po in the Careni mountains).
