= Microserica variicornis =

Scientific classification
- Kingdom: Animalia
- Phylum: Arthropoda
- Clade: Pancrustacea
- Class: Insecta
- Order: Coleoptera
- Suborder: Polyphaga
- Infraorder: Scarabaeiformia
- Family: Scarabaeidae
- Genus: Microserica
- Species: M. variicornis

Binomial name
- Microserica variicornis Moser, 1922

Species of beetle

Microserica variicornis is a species of beetle of the family Scarabaeidae. It is found in Indonesia (Sumatra).

== Description ==
Adults reach a length of about 4.5 mm. They are very similar to Microserica singalangia, but the antennal club is shorter than the stalk, and the first segment is shorter. Furthermore, the intervals between the rows of punctures on the elytra are flat, while they are slightly convex in M. singalangia.
