= Microserica binaluana =

Scientific classification
- Kingdom: Animalia
- Phylum: Arthropoda
- Clade: Pancrustacea
- Class: Insecta
- Order: Coleoptera
- Suborder: Polyphaga
- Infraorder: Scarabaeiformia
- Family: Scarabaeidae
- Genus: Microserica
- Species: M. binaluana

Binomial name
- Microserica binaluana Moser, 1922

Species of beetle

Microserica binaluana is a species of beetle of the family Scarabaeidae. It is found in the Philippines (Palawan).

== Description ==
Adults reach a length of about 4.5–5 mm. They are rufous-yellow and opaque, with the suture of the elytra and sides infuscated. The head and pronotum are greenish. The head is sparsely punctate, with larger punctures and erect setae. The antennae are yellow.
