= Microserica fascipennis =

Scientific classification
- Kingdom: Animalia
- Phylum: Arthropoda
- Clade: Pancrustacea
- Class: Insecta
- Order: Coleoptera
- Suborder: Polyphaga
- Infraorder: Scarabaeiformia
- Family: Scarabaeidae
- Genus: Microserica
- Species: M. fascipennis

Binomial name
- Microserica fascipennis Moser, 1911

Species of beetle

Microserica fascipennis is a species of beetle of the family Scarabaeidae. It is found in Malaysia (Sarawak).

== Description ==
Adults reach a length of about 5 mm. The upper surface is dull, with only the clypeus shiny. The pronotum is uniformly yellowish-brown and has individual setae on the sides. The elytra are punctate-striate, the intervals only very weakly raised, the punctures with tiny setae. The suture, lateral, and posterior margins are black. A little behind the middle, a black transverse band extends from the black lateral margin, which is widened at this point, to the suture. In the middle, this band shows a short, posteriorly running longitudinal streak on each elytron.
