= Microserica sarawakana =

Scientific classification
- Kingdom: Animalia
- Phylum: Arthropoda
- Clade: Pancrustacea
- Class: Insecta
- Order: Coleoptera
- Suborder: Polyphaga
- Infraorder: Scarabaeiformia
- Family: Scarabaeidae
- Genus: Microserica
- Species: M. sarawakana

Binomial name
- Microserica sarawakana Moser, 1920

Species of beetle

Microserica sarawakana is a species of beetle of the family Scarabaeidae. It is found in Malaysia (Sarawak).

== Description ==
Adults reach a length of about 7 mm. They are opaque and dark brown, with a green head. The elytra have black margins and black lines. The head is subtly punctate and sparsely setose. The antennae are reddish-yellow.
