= Microserica vipinglangensis =

Scientific classification
- Kingdom: Animalia
- Phylum: Arthropoda
- Class: Insecta
- Order: Coleoptera
- Suborder: Polyphaga
- Infraorder: Scarabaeiformia
- Family: Scarabaeidae
- Genus: Microserica
- Species: M. vipinglangensis

Binomial name
- Microserica vipinglangensis Ahrens, Lukic & Liu, 2023

Species of beetle

Microserica vipinglangensis is a species of beetle of the family Scarabaeidae. It is found in China (Yunnan).

== Description ==
Adults reach a length of about 5.2 mm. They have a black, oval body. Part of the antennae, as well as the anterior and middle legs are brown. The dorsal surface is glabrous and shiny, while the ventral surface is dull.

== Etymology ==
The species name is derived from the name of its type locality, Vipinglang.
