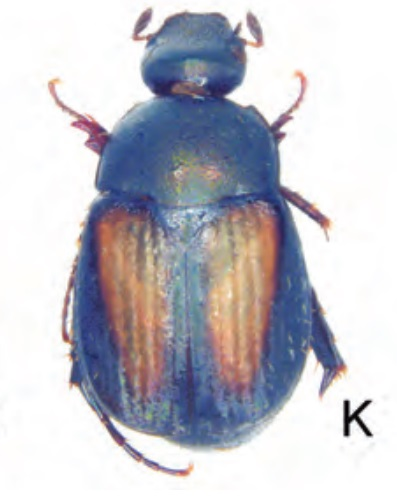

Scientific classification
- Kingdom: Animalia
- Phylum: Arthropoda
- Class: Insecta
- Order: Coleoptera
- Suborder: Polyphaga
- Infraorder: Scarabaeiformia
- Family: Scarabaeidae
- Genus: Anomioserica
- Species: A. kotagiriensis

Binomial name
- Anomioserica kotagiriensis Ahrens & Fabrizi, 2016

= Anomioserica kotagiriensis =

Species of beetle

Anomioserica kotagiriensis is a species of beetle of the family Scarabaeidae. It is found in India (Tamil Nadu, Karnataka).

== Description ==
Adults reach a length of about 3.9 mm. They have a black, oval body. The head and pronotum with an iridescent greenish shine. The elytra are yellowish brown with black margins and a dark long lateral spot. The dorsal surface is dull and glabrous, except for some white setae on the head and elytra.

== Etymology ==
The species is named for its type locality, Kotagiri.
