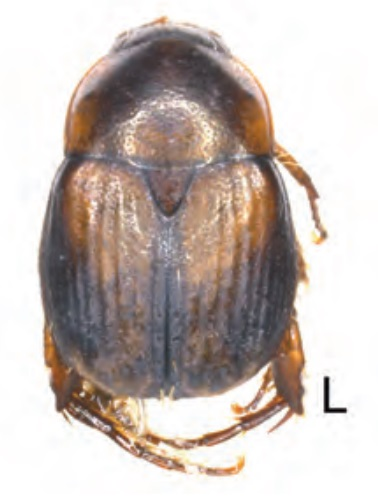

Scientific classification
- Kingdom: Animalia
- Phylum: Arthropoda
- Clade: Pancrustacea
- Class: Insecta
- Order: Coleoptera
- Suborder: Polyphaga
- Infraorder: Scarabaeiformia
- Family: Scarabaeidae
- Genus: Anomioserica
- Species: A. liliputana

Binomial name
- Anomioserica liliputana (Moser, 1916)

Synonyms
- Autoserica liliputana Moser, 1916

= Anomioserica liliputana =

Species of beetle

Anomioserica liliputana is a species of beetle of the family Scarabaeidae. It is found in southern India.

== Description ==
Adults reach a length of about 3.4–4.6 mm. They have a black, oval body. The head and pronotum with a greenish shine. The margins of the pronotum and elytra are yellowish or reddish brown, the latter with a dark long lateral spot. The dorsal surface is dull and glabrous, except for some white setae on the head and elytra.
