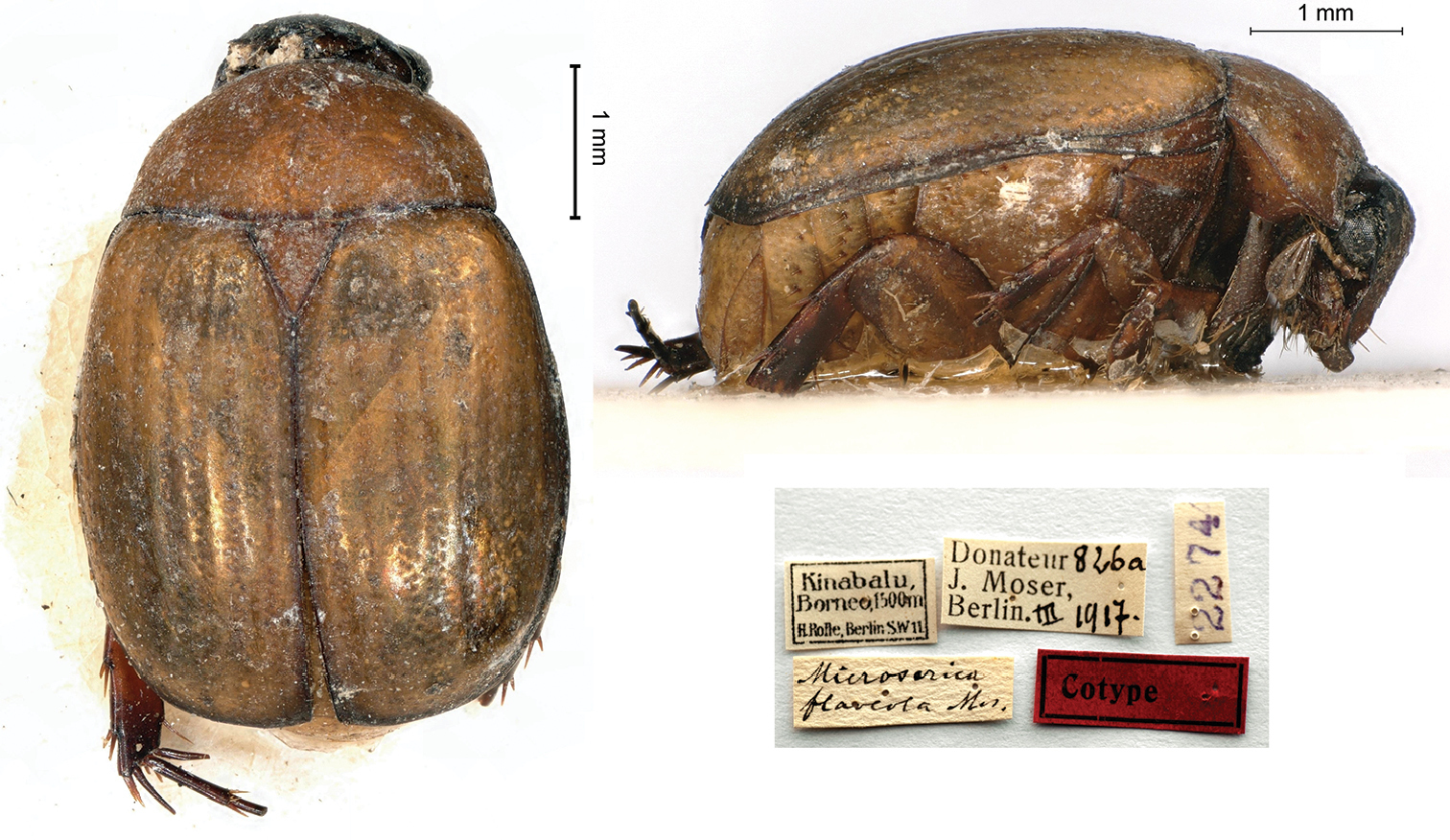

Scientific classification
- Kingdom: Animalia
- Phylum: Arthropoda
- Clade: Pancrustacea
- Class: Insecta
- Order: Coleoptera
- Suborder: Polyphaga
- Infraorder: Scarabaeiformia
- Family: Scarabaeidae
- Genus: Microserica
- Species: M. flaveola

Binomial name
- Microserica flaveola Moser, 1911

= Microserica flaveola =

Species of beetle

Microserica flaveola is a species of beetle of the family Scarabaeidae. It is found in Malaysia (Sabah).

== Description ==
Adults reach a length of about 4.5 mm. They are golden-yellow, with a brown underside and a greenish-shimmering frons. The frons is also finely punctate. The pronotum does not show any punctation, due to the tomentum covering. There are a few brown setae on the anterior margin and lateral margins. The elytra have double rows of punctures, with the spaces between them only very weakly convex and unpunctate, with the exception of the first row next to the suture, which has only a few punctures.
