= Microserica mutabilis =

Scientific classification
- Kingdom: Animalia
- Phylum: Arthropoda
- Class: Insecta
- Order: Coleoptera
- Suborder: Polyphaga
- Infraorder: Scarabaeiformia
- Family: Scarabaeidae
- Genus: Microserica
- Species: M. mutabilis

Binomial name
- Microserica mutabilis (Burmeister, 1855)

Synonyms
- Serica mutabilis Burmeister, 1855

Species of beetle

Microserica mutabilis is a species of beetle of the family Scarabaeidae. It is found in Indonesia (Java).

== Description ==
Adults reach a length of about 3.5 mm. They have a shortly rounded, dull, black (although the head is somewhat greenish), faintly opalescent body. They are silky-glossy underneath. The pronotum is almost straight laterally, not projecting anteriorly. The elytra are irregularly punctate in the striae, with the intervals only slightly raised, but still clearly visible.
