= Microserica sibuyana =

Scientific classification
- Kingdom: Animalia
- Phylum: Arthropoda
- Clade: Pancrustacea
- Class: Insecta
- Order: Coleoptera
- Suborder: Polyphaga
- Infraorder: Scarabaeiformia
- Family: Scarabaeidae
- Genus: Microserica
- Species: M. sibuyana

Binomial name
- Microserica sibuyana Moser, 1922

Species of beetle

Microserica sibuyana is a species of beetle of the family Scarabaeidae. It is found in the Philippines (Sibuyan).

== Description ==
Adults reach a length of about 5 mm. They are dull and reddish, with the pronotum sometimes green, or blackish-green everywhere. The head is sparsely punctate and the antennae are reddish-yellow. The pronotum has ciliated sides and is subtly punctate. The elytra areseriate-punctate, with interstices slightly convex and covered with punctures.
