= Microserica duplosetosa =

Scientific classification
- Kingdom: Animalia
- Phylum: Arthropoda
- Clade: Pancrustacea
- Class: Insecta
- Order: Coleoptera
- Suborder: Polyphaga
- Infraorder: Scarabaeiformia
- Family: Scarabaeidae
- Genus: Microserica
- Species: M. duplosetosa

Binomial name
- Microserica duplosetosa Moser, 1915

Species of beetle

Microserica duplosetosa is a species of beetle of the family Scarabaeidae. It is found in Vietnam.

== Description ==
Adults reach a length of about 7 mm. They are dull and blackish-brown above, and brown below. The frons has some yellowish setae and the antennae are yellowish-brown. The pronotum is rather sparsely punctate, the punctures with tiny setae. The lateral margins and the anterior margin are covered with yellow setae. The elytra are weakly ribbed and irregularly punctate. The punctures have very small but distinct yellowish setae. Scattered among them are long, barely erect yellow setae.
