= Microserica suavidica =

Scientific classification
- Kingdom: Animalia
- Phylum: Arthropoda
- Class: Insecta
- Order: Coleoptera
- Suborder: Polyphaga
- Infraorder: Scarabaeiformia
- Family: Scarabaeidae
- Genus: Microserica
- Species: M. suavidica

Binomial name
- Microserica suavidica Brenske, 1899

Species of beetle

Microserica suavidica is a species of beetle of the family Scarabaeidae. It is found in Indonesia (Sumatra).

== Description ==
Adults reach a length of about 5 mm. They are dull and yellowish-brown, almost golden above, with a dark head and very differently patterned pronotum and elytra. The pronotum is not projecting anteriorly, the sides are extremely weakly rounded, but with strong marginal setae and tiny hairs in the punctures, with strong erect setae in the corners. The elytra are irregularly striated, punctate, with the intervals flat and minutely hairy.
