= Microserica balbalana =

Scientific classification
- Kingdom: Animalia
- Phylum: Arthropoda
- Clade: Pancrustacea
- Class: Insecta
- Order: Coleoptera
- Suborder: Polyphaga
- Infraorder: Scarabaeiformia
- Family: Scarabaeidae
- Genus: Microserica
- Species: M. balbalana

Binomial name
- Microserica balbalana Moser, 1922

Species of beetle

Microserica balbalana is a species of beetle of the family Scarabaeidae. It is found in the Philippines (Luzon).

== Description ==
Adults reach a length of about 5 mm. They are dull and red, with the frons, middle of the pronotum and suture of the elytra black. The head is sparsely punctate and the antennae are rust-coloured. The sides of the pronotum are ciliated and the surface is subtly punctate. The elytra are seriate-punctate, with the interstices slightly convex and sparsely covered with punctures.
