= Microserica lineatipennis =

Scientific classification
- Kingdom: Animalia
- Phylum: Arthropoda
- Clade: Pancrustacea
- Class: Insecta
- Order: Coleoptera
- Suborder: Polyphaga
- Infraorder: Scarabaeiformia
- Family: Scarabaeidae
- Genus: Microserica
- Species: M. lineatipennis

Binomial name
- Microserica lineatipennis Moser, 1921

Species of beetle

Microserica lineatipennis is a species of beetle of the family Scarabaeidae. It is found in Malaysia (Sabah).

== Description ==
Adults reach a length of about 4.5 mm. The head and pronotum are greenish-black, while the elytra are red with black lines, the pygidium and underside blackish to dark brown. The frons is subtly punctate and the antennae are tawny. The pronotum is moderately densely punctate.
