= Microserica pontionakana =

Scientific classification
- Kingdom: Animalia
- Phylum: Arthropoda
- Clade: Pancrustacea
- Class: Insecta
- Order: Coleoptera
- Suborder: Polyphaga
- Infraorder: Scarabaeiformia
- Family: Scarabaeidae
- Genus: Microserica
- Species: M. pontionakana

Binomial name
- Microserica pontionakana Moser, 1920

Species of beetle

Microserica pontionakana is a species of beetle of the family Scarabaeidae. It is found in Indonesia (Kalimantan).

== Description ==
Adults reach a length of about 6 mm. They are opaque, with the head, pronotum and scutellum greenish-black, while the elytra are fulvous with a black margin and black lines. The pygidium and undersurface are blackish-fuscous. The head is sparsely punctate, with few setae. The antennae are reddish-yellow.
