= Microserica seticeps =

Scientific classification
- Kingdom: Animalia
- Phylum: Arthropoda
- Clade: Pancrustacea
- Class: Insecta
- Order: Coleoptera
- Suborder: Polyphaga
- Infraorder: Scarabaeiformia
- Family: Scarabaeidae
- Genus: Microserica
- Species: M. seticeps

Binomial name
- Microserica seticeps Moser, 1924

Species of beetle

Microserica seticeps is a species of beetle of the family Scarabaeidae. It is found in Indonesia (Sumatra).

== Description ==
Adults reach a length of about 6 mm. They are yellow and opaque, with the head and pronotum with a greenish sheen. The elytra are slightly sulcate, subtly punctate and clothed with very minute setae.
