= Microserica fugax =

Scientific classification
- Kingdom: Animalia
- Phylum: Arthropoda
- Class: Insecta
- Order: Coleoptera
- Suborder: Polyphaga
- Infraorder: Scarabaeiformia
- Family: Scarabaeidae
- Genus: Microserica
- Species: M. fugax

Binomial name
- Microserica fugax (Erichson, 1834)

Synonyms
- Serica fugax Erichson, 1834

Species of beetle

Microserica fugax is a species of beetle of the family Scarabaeidae. It is found in the Philippines (Luzon).

== Description ==
Adults reach a length of about 10 mm. They are deep black with a deep green sheen, which is particularly distinct on the pronotum. The pronotum is twice as wide as long, convex transversely, widely punctate, with a very small, short white hair in each puncture. The elytra are somewhat wider than the pronotum, gently widened in the middle, convex, punctate in the same way as the pronotum. The stria next to the suture is particularly distinct posteriorly, the others only noticeable in a certain direction. On the underside, the margins of the abdominal segments are dark reddish-brown. The legs are the same color as the body.
