= Microserica phanrangensis =

Scientific classification
- Kingdom: Animalia
- Phylum: Arthropoda
- Class: Insecta
- Order: Coleoptera
- Suborder: Polyphaga
- Infraorder: Scarabaeiformia
- Family: Scarabaeidae
- Genus: Microserica
- Species: M. phanrangensis

Binomial name
- Microserica phanrangensis Ahrens, 2002

Species of beetle

Microserica phanrangensis is a species of beetle of the family Scarabaeidae. It is found in Vietnam.

== Description ==
Adults reach a length of about 4.6–5.7 mm. They have a broad, oval, moderately convex body. They are yellowish-brown with a dark head or uniformly blackish-brown. The surface is dull (partly with a greenish iridescent sheen) and glabrous, except for the legs and the anterior labroclypeus.
