= Microserica obscurella =

Scientific classification
- Kingdom: Animalia
- Phylum: Arthropoda
- Clade: Pancrustacea
- Class: Insecta
- Order: Coleoptera
- Suborder: Polyphaga
- Infraorder: Scarabaeiformia
- Family: Scarabaeidae
- Genus: Microserica
- Species: M. obscurella

Binomial name
- Microserica obscurella Moser, 1916

Species of beetle

Microserica obscurella is a species of beetle of the family Scarabaeidae. It is found in Indonesia (Sumatra).

== Description ==
Adults reach a length of about 5 mm. They are small, roundish and black. The head is sparsely covered with setae and the frons is dull. Due to the tomentum covering, the punctation of the pronotum is only indistinctly visible. The anterior margin and the lateral margins are setate. The elytra are weakly furrowed and widely punctate. The sutural angles have a strong bristle.
