= Microserica hexaphylla =

Scientific classification
- Kingdom: Animalia
- Phylum: Arthropoda
- Clade: Pancrustacea
- Class: Insecta
- Order: Coleoptera
- Suborder: Polyphaga
- Infraorder: Scarabaeiformia
- Family: Scarabaeidae
- Genus: Microserica
- Species: M. hexaphylla

Binomial name
- Microserica hexaphylla Moser, 1916

Species of beetle

Microserica hexaphylla is a species of beetle of the family Scarabaeidae. It is found in Indonesia (Sumatra).

== Description ==
Adults reach a length of about 4.5 mm. They are brown, but the upper surface is more or less darkened and the pronotum is usually olive-green. The frons is dull, green, finely punctate and has a row of setae behind the suture. The pronotum is fairly densely punctate and the anterior margin and the lateral margins are setate. The elytra are weakly furrowed and the furrows are covered with tiny bristled punctures, with the spaces between them almost unpunctate.
