= Microserica quinquefoliata =

Scientific classification
- Kingdom: Animalia
- Phylum: Arthropoda
- Clade: Pancrustacea
- Class: Insecta
- Order: Coleoptera
- Suborder: Polyphaga
- Infraorder: Scarabaeiformia
- Family: Scarabaeidae
- Genus: Microserica
- Species: M. quinquefoliata

Binomial name
- Microserica quinquefoliata Moser, 1915

Species of beetle

Microserica quinquefoliata is a species of beetle of the family Scarabaeidae. It is found in Indonesia (Sumatra).

== Description ==
Adults reach a length of about 4 mm. The colouration is highly variable. Usually, the head and pronotum are green, the elytra yellowish-brown with black suture and blackish-brown margins. The pygidium is black or red and the underside partly dark green, partly dark brown. On the elytra, the black colouration can extend further, and some specimens even have an entirely black elytra. The frons is finely punctate with a row of setae behind the suture. The pronotum is moderately densely punctured and the punctures, like those on the elytra, have tiny setae. The elytra have rows of punctures and the almost unpunctate spaces between them are only slightly convex.
