= Microserica soppongensis =

Scientific classification
- Kingdom: Animalia
- Phylum: Arthropoda
- Class: Insecta
- Order: Coleoptera
- Suborder: Polyphaga
- Infraorder: Scarabaeiformia
- Family: Scarabaeidae
- Genus: Microserica
- Species: M. soppongensis

Binomial name
- Microserica soppongensis Ahrens, 2005

Species of beetle

Microserica soppongensis is a species of beetle of the family Scarabaeidae. It is found in Thailand.

== Description ==
Adults reach a length of about 4.8–5 mm. They have a black, oblong body. The legs are dark brown and the elytra reddish brown, the latter with black sutural and lateral intervals. The dorsal surface is dull and nearly glabrous.

== Etymology ==
The species is named after the type locality, Soppong.
