= Microserica pisangana =

Scientific classification
- Kingdom: Animalia
- Phylum: Arthropoda
- Class: Insecta
- Order: Coleoptera
- Suborder: Polyphaga
- Infraorder: Scarabaeiformia
- Family: Scarabaeidae
- Genus: Microserica
- Species: M. pisangana

Binomial name
- Microserica pisangana Brenske, 1899

Species of beetle

Microserica pisangana is a species of beetle of the family Scarabaeidae. It is found in Indonesia (Sumatra).

== Description ==
Adults reach a length of about 6.7–7 mm. They are very dull, deep black, with the thorax greenish, and without an opalescent sheen. The frons has a dense row of rather strong setae at the suture, and is very finely punctate. The short pronotum is almost straight at the sides, distinctly setate, with angular hind angles, finely punctate, with a finely indicated longitudinal line in front of the small scutellum. The elytra are finely but inconsistently punctate in the striae, with the intervals distinctly convex, smooth and not wider than the striae.
