= Microserica liangensis =

Scientific classification
- Kingdom: Animalia
- Phylum: Arthropoda
- Class: Insecta
- Order: Coleoptera
- Suborder: Polyphaga
- Infraorder: Scarabaeiformia
- Family: Scarabaeidae
- Genus: Microserica
- Species: M. liangensis

Binomial name
- Microserica liangensis Brenske, 1899

Species of beetle

Microserica liangensis is a species of beetle of the family Scarabaeidae. It is found in the Philippines (Mindanao).

== Description ==
Adults reach a length of about 5 mm. They are dull, blackish-brown underneath and black above. The striae of the elytra are finely, almost regularly punctate, the narrow intervals with scattered punctures and only slightly raised.
