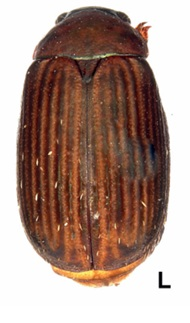

Scientific classification
- Kingdom: Animalia
- Phylum: Arthropoda
- Class: Insecta
- Order: Coleoptera
- Suborder: Polyphaga
- Infraorder: Scarabaeiformia
- Family: Scarabaeidae
- Genus: Microserica
- Species: M. costisquamosa

Binomial name
- Microserica costisquamosa (Ahrens, Fabrizi & Liu, 2019)

Synonyms
- Neoserica costisquamosa Ahrens, Fabrizi & Liu, 2019

= Microserica costisquamosa =

Species of beetle

Microserica costisquamosa is a species of beetle of the family Scarabaeidae. It is found in China (Guizhou).

== Description ==
Adults reach a length of about 7.8 mm. They have a dark reddish brown, oval body. The antennal club is yellowish brown and the frons, disc of the pronotum and centre of the elytral intervals are darker with a greenish shine. The dorsal surface is dull and glabrous, except for a few white large scale-like setae on the odd intervals. The labroclypeus is shiny.

== Etymology ==
The name of the species is derived from the combined Latin words, costa (meaning ridge) and squama (meaning scale), with reference to the large scales on odd elytral intervals.
