= Microserica perdix =

Scientific classification
- Kingdom: Animalia
- Phylum: Arthropoda
- Class: Insecta
- Order: Coleoptera
- Suborder: Polyphaga
- Infraorder: Scarabaeiformia
- Family: Scarabaeidae
- Genus: Microserica
- Species: M. perdix

Binomial name
- Microserica perdix Arrow, 1946

Species of beetle

Microserica perdix is a species of beetle of the family Scarabaeidae. It is found in Indonesia (Kalimantan).

== Description ==
Adults reach a length of about 8 mm. They are light brown or reddish-brown, with the clypeus shining greenish-yellow and the remaining upper surface dull and decorated with yellow and black or greenish-black markings. The legs and antennae are yellow.
