= Microserica sanguineicollis =

Scientific classification
- Kingdom: Animalia
- Phylum: Arthropoda
- Clade: Pancrustacea
- Class: Insecta
- Order: Coleoptera
- Suborder: Polyphaga
- Infraorder: Scarabaeiformia
- Family: Scarabaeidae
- Genus: Microserica
- Species: M. sanguineicollis

Binomial name
- Microserica sanguineicollis Moser, 1911

Species of beetle

Microserica sanguineicollis is a species of beetle of the family Scarabaeidae. It is found in Malaysia (Sarawak).

== Description ==
Adults reach a length of about 7 mm. The upper surface is mostly dull and tomentose. The upper surface is very sparsely punctate, each puncture with a protruding brown setae. The frons is likewise sparsely punctate and also has some protruding hairs. The antennae are yellow. The pronotum is blood-red. Next to the lateral margins are red, short transverse wrinkles, so that the lateral margins appear crenulated. The upper surface is moderately densely covered with punctures and next to the lateral margins are erect brown setae. The elytra are black, with the base and the narrow lateral margin in the anterior half reddish. Sometimes the suture is also reddish, and the red colouration can spread over the entire elytra. The elytra have punctate striae composed of three irregular rows of punctures each. The narrow spaces between them are smooth and weakly convex.
