= Microserica septemfoliata =

Scientific classification
- Kingdom: Animalia
- Phylum: Arthropoda
- Class: Insecta
- Order: Coleoptera
- Suborder: Polyphaga
- Infraorder: Scarabaeiformia
- Family: Scarabaeidae
- Genus: Microserica
- Species: M. septemfoliata

Binomial name
- Microserica septemfoliata (Frey, 1972)

Synonyms
- Trichoserica septemfoliata Frey, 1972

Species of beetle

Microserica septemfoliata is a species of beetle of the family Scarabaeidae. It is found in Vietnam.

== Description ==
Adults reach a length of about 4.7 mm. They have a yellowish brown, oblong-oval body. The antennae are yellow and the frons, small spots on the elytral intervals and two large spots on each side of the pronotum are darker brown. The dorsal surface is dull (but the labroclypeus and anterior frons are shiny) and almost glabrous.
