= Microserica strigosa =

Scientific classification
- Kingdom: Animalia
- Phylum: Arthropoda
- Class: Insecta
- Order: Coleoptera
- Suborder: Polyphaga
- Infraorder: Scarabaeiformia
- Family: Scarabaeidae
- Genus: Microserica
- Species: M. strigosa

Binomial name
- Microserica strigosa Brenske, 1899

Species of beetle

Microserica strigosa is a species of beetle of the family Scarabaeidae. It is found in Malaysia (Sabah).

== Description ==
Adults reach a length of about 4-4.5 mm. They are dull, with the head always darker, and the pronotum and elytra dirty yellowish with a greenish tinge. The pronotum is straight at the sides, the hind angles are sharp, the surface finely punctate. The elytra are narrowly striate in the intervals, smooth, with punctate striae.
