= Microserica nigrovittata =

Scientific classification
- Kingdom: Animalia
- Phylum: Arthropoda
- Clade: Pancrustacea
- Class: Insecta
- Order: Coleoptera
- Suborder: Polyphaga
- Infraorder: Scarabaeiformia
- Family: Scarabaeidae
- Genus: Microserica
- Species: M. nigrovittata

Binomial name
- Microserica nigrovittata Moser, 1911

Species of beetle

Microserica nigrovittata is a species of beetle of the family Scarabaeidae. It is found in Malaysia (Sabah).

== Description ==
Adults reach a length of about 5.5 mm. They are dull, with only the clypeus, tibiae and tarsi shiny. The head is dark green and the pronotum is blackish-green and finely and widely punctate. The scutellum is also dark green. The elytra are weakly longitudinally striated, brownish-yellow, the lateral and posterior margins, as well as the suture, are black. On the disc, there is a black longitudinal band, which does not reach the anterior and posterior margins.
