= Microserica quadrimaculata =

Scientific classification
- Kingdom: Animalia
- Phylum: Arthropoda
- Class: Insecta
- Order: Coleoptera
- Suborder: Polyphaga
- Infraorder: Scarabaeiformia
- Family: Scarabaeidae
- Genus: Microserica
- Species: M. quadrimaculata

Binomial name
- Microserica quadrimaculata (Brenske, 1894)

Synonyms
- Serica quadrimaculata Brenske, 1894

Species of beetle

Microserica quadrimaculata is a species of beetle of the family Scarabaeidae. It is found on Borneo.

== Description ==
Adults reach a length of about 5.5 mm. The underside is yellowish-brown and faintly iridescent. The head is dark, the frons greenish and the thorax yellow with a narrow, arched transverse stripe in front of the scutellum. The elytra are black with four yellow spots.
