= Microserica opalina =

Scientific classification
- Kingdom: Animalia
- Phylum: Arthropoda
- Clade: Pancrustacea
- Class: Insecta
- Order: Coleoptera
- Suborder: Polyphaga
- Infraorder: Scarabaeiformia
- Family: Scarabaeidae
- Genus: Microserica
- Species: M. opalina

Binomial name
- Microserica opalina (Burmeister, 1855)

Synonyms
- Serica opalina Burmeister, 1855

Species of beetle

Microserica opalina is a species of beetle of the family Scarabaeidae. It is found in India.

== Description ==
Adults reach a length of about 4.5 mm. They have yellowish elytra with black spots and margins.
