= Microserica ferestictica =

Scientific classification
- Kingdom: Animalia
- Phylum: Arthropoda
- Class: Insecta
- Order: Coleoptera
- Suborder: Polyphaga
- Infraorder: Scarabaeiformia
- Family: Scarabaeidae
- Genus: Microserica
- Species: M. ferestictica

Binomial name
- Microserica ferestictica Ahrens, Lukic & Liu, 2023

Species of beetle

Microserica ferestictica is a species of beetle of the family Scarabaeidae. It is found in China (Yunnan).

== Description ==
Adults reach a length of about 6 mm. They have an oval body. The body (including legs and antennae) is yellow, with two spots on the pronotum, multiple symmetric smaller spots on the elytra, and the abdomen brown. The frons is slightly darker posteriorly. The dorsal surface is dull, the brown areas with some greenish shine. The surface is nearly glabrous.

== Etymology ==
The species name is derived from Latin fere- (meaning almost) and sticticus (meaning line, file) and refers to the imperfect stripe-dotted colour pattern of the elytra.
