= Microserica strigata =

Scientific classification
- Kingdom: Animalia
- Phylum: Arthropoda
- Class: Insecta
- Order: Coleoptera
- Suborder: Polyphaga
- Infraorder: Scarabaeiformia
- Family: Scarabaeidae
- Genus: Microserica
- Species: M. strigata

Binomial name
- Microserica strigata Brenske, 1899

Species of beetle

Microserica strigata is a species of beetle of the family Scarabaeidae. It is found in Malaysia (Sabah).

== Description ==
Adults reach a length of about 5–6 mm. The frons and pronotum are greenish and dull, the latter with yellow setae on its almost straight sides, the anterior margin very slightly projecting in the middle. The scutellum is elongate. The elytra are dark green and dull, pointed in the middle. Across the middle, each side has a slanting, yellowish-brown stripe, extending from the middle of the base towards the end of the suture, though it does not reach either the suture or the margin. The ribs are narrow, the intervals densely and irregularly punctate. The abdomen is brown, with strong setae.
