= Microserica panayana =

Scientific classification
- Kingdom: Animalia
- Phylum: Arthropoda
- Clade: Pancrustacea
- Class: Insecta
- Order: Coleoptera
- Suborder: Polyphaga
- Infraorder: Scarabaeiformia
- Family: Scarabaeidae
- Genus: Microserica
- Species: M. panayana

Binomial name
- Microserica panayana Moser, 1924

Species of beetle

Microserica panayana is a species of beetle of the family Scarabaeidae. It is found in the Philippines (Panay).

== Description ==
Adults reach a length of about 4.5 mm. They are reddish and opaque, the head, middle of the pronotum and sides of the elytra with some black-green stripes and markings.
