= Microserica benomensis =

Scientific classification
- Kingdom: Animalia
- Phylum: Arthropoda
- Class: Insecta
- Order: Coleoptera
- Suborder: Polyphaga
- Infraorder: Scarabaeiformia
- Family: Scarabaeidae
- Genus: Microserica
- Species: M. benomensis

Binomial name
- Microserica benomensis Ahrens, 2002

Species of beetle

Microserica benomensis is a species of beetle of the family Scarabaeidae. It is found in Malaysia.

== Description ==
Adults reach a length of about 4.7–4.9 mm. They have a broad, oval, moderately convex body. They are uniformly black or the pronotum and elytra are more or less extensively yellow. The surface is dull (partly with a greenish iridescent sheen) and glabrous, except for the legs and the anterior labroclypeus.

== Etymology ==
The species is named after its type locality, the Benom mountains.
