= Microserica agraria =

Scientific classification
- Kingdom: Animalia
- Phylum: Arthropoda
- Clade: Pancrustacea
- Class: Insecta
- Order: Coleoptera
- Suborder: Polyphaga
- Infraorder: Scarabaeiformia
- Family: Scarabaeidae
- Genus: Microserica
- Species: M. agraria

Binomial name
- Microserica agraria Brenske, 1899

Species of beetle

Microserica agraria is a species of beetle of the family Scarabaeidae. It is found in Indonesia (Sumatra).

== Description ==
Adults reach a length of about 6 mm. They are dull, dark brown with a greenish sheen, and without an opalescent luster. The clypeus has a weakly raised margin anteriorly, is finely and singly punctate, slightly tuberculate, and has a very fine suture. The pronotum is almost straight on the sides, the posterior angles very slightly rounded, and finely punctate. The elytra are almost uniformly punctate with very narrow, smooth intervals that are slightly raised. The punctures have minute hairs. The pygidium is pointed.
