= Microserica balabacensis =

Scientific classification
- Kingdom: Animalia
- Phylum: Arthropoda
- Clade: Pancrustacea
- Class: Insecta
- Order: Coleoptera
- Suborder: Polyphaga
- Infraorder: Scarabaeiformia
- Family: Scarabaeidae
- Genus: Microserica
- Species: M. balabacensis

Binomial name
- Microserica balabacensis Moser, 1922

Species of beetle

Microserica balabacensis is a species of beetle of the family Scarabaeidae. It is found in the Philippines (Palawan).

== Description ==
Adults reach a length of about 4.5 mm. They are opaque and dark, with a green frons, a greenish pronotum and red elytra. The head is quite remotely punctate, and the frons is covered with setae. The antennae are rust-coloured.
