= Microserica lampungensis =

Scientific classification
- Kingdom: Animalia
- Phylum: Arthropoda
- Class: Insecta
- Order: Coleoptera
- Suborder: Polyphaga
- Infraorder: Scarabaeiformia
- Family: Scarabaeidae
- Genus: Microserica
- Species: M. lampungensis

Binomial name
- Microserica lampungensis Ahrens, 2003

Species of beetle

Microserica lampungensis is a species of beetle of the family Scarabaeidae. It is found in Indonesia (Sumatra).

== Description ==
Adults reach a length of about 5.8–6.4 mm. They have a dark or reddish brown, oval body, partly with a greenish lustre. The sides of the pronotum and elytra are yellow and each elytron has two large yellowish transversal bands or dots. The antennae are brown. The dorsal surface (except for the shiny labroclypeus and tibia) is dull and glabrous.
