= Microserica spilota =

Scientific classification
- Kingdom: Animalia
- Phylum: Arthropoda
- Clade: Pancrustacea
- Class: Insecta
- Order: Coleoptera
- Suborder: Polyphaga
- Infraorder: Scarabaeiformia
- Family: Scarabaeidae
- Genus: Microserica
- Species: M. spilota

Binomial name
- Microserica spilota Moser, 1920

Species of beetle

Microserica spilota is a species of beetle of the family Scarabaeidae. It is found on Borneo.

== Description ==
Adults reach a length of about 6 mm. They have an oblong-oval, opaque body. The underside is blackish-brown. Above, the head and pronotum are greenish-black and the elytra are black, with a rufous-yellow spot. The antennae are ferruginous.
