= Microserica multipunctata =

Scientific classification
- Kingdom: Animalia
- Phylum: Arthropoda
- Class: Insecta
- Order: Coleoptera
- Suborder: Polyphaga
- Infraorder: Scarabaeiformia
- Family: Scarabaeidae
- Genus: Microserica
- Species: M. multipunctata

Binomial name
- Microserica multipunctata Ahrens, Lukic & Liu, 2023

Species of beetle

Microserica multipunctata is a species of beetle of the family Scarabaeidae. It is found in Laos.

== Description ==
Adults reach a length of about 5.9 mm. They have a yellowish brown, oval body, with the lateral elytral intervals, frons, two large pairs of spots on the pronotum and multiple dots on the elytra brown. The dorsal surface is dull and nearly glabrous.

== Etymology ==
The species name is derived from Latin multi (meaning multiple) and punctatus (meaning with punctures) and refers to the multiple dots on the elytra.
