= Microserica humilis =

Scientific classification
- Kingdom: Animalia
- Phylum: Arthropoda
- Class: Insecta
- Order: Coleoptera
- Suborder: Polyphaga
- Infraorder: Scarabaeiformia
- Family: Scarabaeidae
- Genus: Microserica
- Species: M. humilis

Binomial name
- Microserica humilis Brenske, 1899

Species of beetle

Microserica humilis is a species of beetle of the family Scarabaeidae. It is found in the Philippines (Luzon).

== Description ==
Adults reach a length of about 4.3 mm. They have a rounded-oval, dull body. They are blackish-green above and dark brown and silky-glossy below.
