= Microserica quinquelamellata =

Scientific classification
- Kingdom: Animalia
- Phylum: Arthropoda
- Clade: Pancrustacea
- Class: Insecta
- Order: Coleoptera
- Suborder: Polyphaga
- Infraorder: Scarabaeiformia
- Family: Scarabaeidae
- Genus: Microserica
- Species: M. quinquelamellata

Binomial name
- Microserica quinquelamellata Moser, 1920

Species of beetle

Microserica quinquelamellata is a species of beetle of the family Scarabaeidae. It is found in Malaysia (Sabah).

== Description ==
Adults reach a length of about 5.5 mm. They have an ovate, convex and opaque body.. The head and pronotum are blackish-green, while the elytra are black. The underside of the body is blackish-brown. The antennae are reddish-yellow.
