= Microserica affinis =

Scientific classification
- Kingdom: Animalia
- Phylum: Arthropoda
- Class: Insecta
- Order: Coleoptera
- Suborder: Polyphaga
- Infraorder: Scarabaeiformia
- Family: Scarabaeidae
- Genus: Microserica
- Species: M. affinis

Binomial name
- Microserica affinis Arrow, 1946

Species of beetle

Microserica affinis is a species of beetle of the family Scarabaeidae. It is found in India (Assam, Arunachal Pradesh) and northern Myanmar.

== Description ==
Adults reach a length of about 5.1-5.5 mm. They have a black, short oval, strongly convex body. Except for the legs and the anterior labroclypeus, the entire surface is dull and glabrous.
