= Microserica quadripustulata =

Scientific classification
- Kingdom: Animalia
- Phylum: Arthropoda
- Clade: Pancrustacea
- Class: Insecta
- Order: Coleoptera
- Suborder: Polyphaga
- Infraorder: Scarabaeiformia
- Family: Scarabaeidae
- Genus: Microserica
- Species: M. quadripustulata

Binomial name
- Microserica quadripustulata Moser, 1915

Synonyms
- Microserica flavopicta Arrow, 1947

Species of beetle

Microserica quadripustulata is a species of beetle of the family Scarabaeidae. It is found in Malaysia.

== Description ==
Adults reach a length of about 6 mm. The upper surface is black and the underside is blackish-brown. The head and pronotum have a slight greenish sheen. Each elytron has a yellowish-brown spot before the middle, from which a streak extends towards the shoulder, and a rounded spot before the posterior margin. The frons has a row of setae behind the suture. The pronotum has a moderately dense, minutely setate punctation and the lateral margins are setate. The elytra are punctate in the striae and the weakly convex intervals are almost devoid of punctures.
