= Microserica modiglianii =

Scientific classification
- Kingdom: Animalia
- Phylum: Arthropoda
- Clade: Pancrustacea
- Class: Insecta
- Order: Coleoptera
- Suborder: Polyphaga
- Infraorder: Scarabaeiformia
- Family: Scarabaeidae
- Genus: Microserica
- Species: M. modiglianii

Binomial name
- Microserica modiglianii Brenske, 1899

Species of beetle

Microserica modiglianii is a species of beetle of the family Scarabaeidae. It is found in Indonesia (Sumatra).

== Description ==
Adults reach a length of about 4.8–5 mm. They are dull and very faintly opalescent (with the pronotum somewhat more so). They are yellowish-brown, with a green head and with the pronotum and elytra either patterned or unicolorous. The pronotum is almost straight at the sides, very slightly curved posteriorly, the corners pointed, finely punctate. The elytra are finely and densely punctate in the striae, with tiny hairs in the punctures, the intervals narrow and weakly raised. The pygidium is pointed and densely punctate.
