= Microsericaria =

Scientific classification
- Kingdom: Animalia
- Phylum: Arthropoda
- Class: Insecta
- Order: Coleoptera
- Suborder: Polyphaga
- Infraorder: Scarabaeiformia
- Family: Scarabaeidae
- Subfamily: Sericinae
- Tribe: Sericini
- Genus: Microsericaria; Nikolajev, 1979

Genus of leaf beetles

Microsericaria is a genus of beetles belonging to the family Scarabaeidae.

== Species ==
- Microsericaria atropicta (Moser, 1915)
- Microsericaria fenestrata (Arrow, 1946)
- Microsericaria quadrinotata (Moser, 1915)
- Microsericaria quadripunctata (Brenske, 1896)
- Microsericaria stellata (Arrow, 1946)
