= Microserica planiforceps =

Scientific classification
- Kingdom: Animalia
- Phylum: Arthropoda
- Class: Insecta
- Order: Coleoptera
- Suborder: Polyphaga
- Infraorder: Scarabaeiformia
- Family: Scarabaeidae
- Genus: Microserica
- Species: M. planiforceps

Binomial name
- Microserica planiforceps Ahrens, Lukic & Liu, 2023

Species of beetle

Microserica planiforceps is a species of beetle of the family Scarabaeidae. It is found in Laos and Thailand.

== Description ==
Adults reach a length of about 3.6–4.5 mm. They have a yellowish brown, oval body. The lateral and sutural elytral intervals and frons are brown and the dorsal surface is dull and nearly glabrous.

== Etymology ==
The species name is derived from Latin planus (meaning flat) and forceps and refers to the dorsoventrally flattened aedeagus including parameres.
