= Microserica nigriceps =

Scientific classification
- Kingdom: Animalia
- Phylum: Arthropoda
- Class: Insecta
- Order: Coleoptera
- Suborder: Polyphaga
- Infraorder: Scarabaeiformia
- Family: Scarabaeidae
- Genus: Microserica
- Species: M. nigriceps

Binomial name
- Microserica nigriceps Arrow, 1946

Species of beetle

Microserica nigriceps is a species of beetle of the family Scarabaeidae. It is found in Malaysia (Sabah).

== Description ==
Adults reach a length of about 6–7 mm. They are orange-yellow, feebly shining and lightly iridescent, with a black head. The lower surface is reddish and opaque, the legs shining. The antennae are yellow with a black club.
