= Microserica ornata =

Scientific classification
- Kingdom: Animalia
- Phylum: Arthropoda
- Clade: Pancrustacea
- Class: Insecta
- Order: Coleoptera
- Suborder: Polyphaga
- Infraorder: Scarabaeiformia
- Family: Scarabaeidae
- Genus: Microserica
- Species: M. ornata

Binomial name
- Microserica ornata (Nonfried, 1894)

Synonyms
- Serica ornata Nonfried, 1894; Microserica lineola Brenske, 1899

Species of beetle

Microserica ornata is a species of beetle of the family Scarabaeidae. It is found in Indonesia (Sumatra).

== Description ==
Adults reach a length of about 5-5.8 mm. They are dull, the elytra with yellow stripes, and the head and pronotum green, the latter with yellow sides. The underside is blackish-brown, dull, and without luster.
