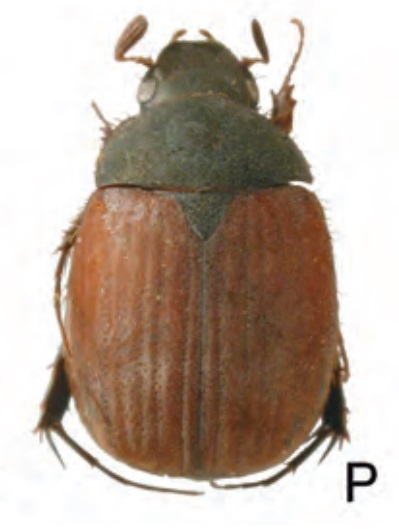

Scientific classification
- Kingdom: Animalia
- Phylum: Arthropoda
- Class: Insecta
- Order: Coleoptera
- Suborder: Polyphaga
- Infraorder: Scarabaeiformia
- Family: Scarabaeidae
- Genus: Microserica
- Species: M. viridicollis

Binomial name
- Microserica viridicollis Arrow, 1913

= Microserica viridicollis =

Species of beetle

Microserica viridicollis is a species of beetle of the family Scarabaeidae. It is found in India (Assam, Meghalaya, Tripura, West Bengal, Sikkim).

== Description ==
Adults reach a length of about 4.6-4.8 mm. They have a black, short oval, strongly convex body. The elytra are sometimes reddish-brown. Except for the legs and the anterior labroclypeus, the entire surface is dull and glabrous.
