= Microserica chaiyaphum =

Scientific classification
- Kingdom: Animalia
- Phylum: Arthropoda
- Class: Insecta
- Order: Coleoptera
- Suborder: Polyphaga
- Infraorder: Scarabaeiformia
- Family: Scarabaeidae
- Genus: Microserica
- Species: M. chaiyaphum

Binomial name
- Microserica chaiyaphum Ahrens, Lukic & Liu, 2023

Species of beetle

Microserica chaiyaphum is a species of beetle of the family Scarabaeidae. It is found in Thailand.

== Description ==
Adults reach a length of about 5.1–5.3 mm. They have a dark brown, oval body, the head and pronotum with some greenish shine. The antennae are yellow and the dorsal and ventral surface are dull with an iridescent shine. The dorsal surface is glabrous.

== Etymology ==
The species is named after its occurrence in the Chaiyaphum province.
