= Microserica nuda =

Scientific classification
- Kingdom: Animalia
- Phylum: Arthropoda
- Class: Insecta
- Order: Coleoptera
- Suborder: Polyphaga
- Infraorder: Scarabaeiformia
- Family: Scarabaeidae
- Genus: Microserica
- Species: M. nuda

Binomial name
- Microserica nuda Ahrens, 2003

Species of beetle

Microserica nuda is a species of beetle of the family Scarabaeidae. It is found in Indonesia (Sumatra).

== Description ==
Adults reach a length of about 6.8 mm. They have a dark reddish brown, oval body, partly with a greenish lustre. The antennae are yellow. The dorsal surface (except for the shiny labroclypeus and tibia) is dull and glabrous.
