= Microserica nicobarensis =

Scientific classification
- Kingdom: Animalia
- Phylum: Arthropoda
- Class: Insecta
- Order: Coleoptera
- Suborder: Polyphaga
- Infraorder: Scarabaeiformia
- Family: Scarabaeidae
- Genus: Microserica
- Species: M. nicobarensis

Binomial name
- Microserica nicobarensis (Redtenbacher, 1868)

Synonyms
- Serica nicobarensis Redtenbacher, 1868

Species of beetle

Microserica nicobarensis is a species of beetle of the family Scarabaeidae. It is found in India (the Nicobar Islands).

== Description ==
Adults reach a length of about 7.7 mm. They have an oblong–oval body. The dorsal surface is dark brown, while the ventral surface is dark reddish-brown and dull. The head is moderately shiny, and the surface is mostly glabrous, except for a few single setae.
