= Microserica cucphuong =

Scientific classification
- Kingdom: Animalia
- Phylum: Arthropoda
- Class: Insecta
- Order: Coleoptera
- Suborder: Polyphaga
- Infraorder: Scarabaeiformia
- Family: Scarabaeidae
- Genus: Microserica
- Species: M. cucphuong

Binomial name
- Microserica cucphuong Ahrens, Lukic & Liu, 2023

Species of beetle

Microserica cucphuong is a species of beetle of the family Scarabaeidae. It is found in Vietnam.

== Description ==
Adults reach a length of about 5.9 mm. They have a yellowish brown, oval body. The lateral elytral intervals, the center of the frons, two large pairs of spots on the pronotum and multiple dots on the elytra are brown. The dorsal surface is dull and nearly glabrous.

== Etymology ==
The species name is derived from the name of its type locality, the Cuc Phuong National Park.
