= Microserica panzona =

Scientific classification
- Kingdom: Animalia
- Phylum: Arthropoda
- Class: Insecta
- Order: Coleoptera
- Suborder: Polyphaga
- Infraorder: Scarabaeiformia
- Family: Scarabaeidae
- Genus: Microserica
- Species: M. panzona

Binomial name
- Microserica panzona Ahrens, 2005

Species of beetle

Microserica panzona is a species of beetle of the family Scarabaeidae. It is found in Laos.

== Description ==
Adults reach a length of about 5.7 mm. They have an entirely black, oblong body. The antennal base is brown. The dorsal surface is dull with only a few setae.

== Etymology ==
The species name is derived from panzone (dialect of Italian, meaning a person with a big belly) and refers to the convex shape of the species.
