= Microserica vinden =

Scientific classification
- Kingdom: Animalia
- Phylum: Arthropoda
- Class: Insecta
- Order: Coleoptera
- Suborder: Polyphaga
- Infraorder: Scarabaeiformia
- Family: Scarabaeidae
- Genus: Microserica
- Species: M. vinden

Binomial name
- Microserica vinden Ahrens, Lukic & Liu, 2023

Species of beetle

Microserica vinden is a species of beetle of the family Scarabaeidae. It is found in Vietnam.

== Description ==
Adults reach a length of about 6.9 mm. They have a brown, oblong-oval body. The antennae and elytral intervals are yellowish brown, while the elytral striae, scutellum, frons and pronotum are darker, with a strong greenish shine. The dorsal surface is dull and, except for large single white, scale-like setae on the odd intervals, glabrous.

== Etymology ==
The species is named after its type locality, Vin Den.
