= Microserica fascigera =

Scientific classification
- Kingdom: Animalia
- Phylum: Arthropoda
- Clade: Pancrustacea
- Class: Insecta
- Order: Coleoptera
- Suborder: Polyphaga
- Infraorder: Scarabaeiformia
- Family: Scarabaeidae
- Genus: Microserica
- Species: M. fascigera

Binomial name
- Microserica fascigera Moser, 1911

Species of beetle

Microserica fascigera is a species of beetle of the family Scarabaeidae. It is found in Malaysia (Sabah).

== Description ==
Adults reach a length of about 4 mm. The upper and lower surfaces are dull, with only the tibiae and clypeus shiny. The pronotum shows no punctures due to the tomentum covering. There are some long, erect setae on the sides. The scutellum is green or yellowish-brown and the elytra are punctate-striate, with the intervals weakly convex. The suture along the lateral and posterior margins of the elytra is black, as is sometimes the narrow anterior margin. In the middle, there is a black transverse band that narrows from the lateral margin towards the suture. The sides have individual setae.
