= Microserica hastata =

Scientific classification
- Kingdom: Animalia
- Phylum: Arthropoda
- Class: Insecta
- Order: Coleoptera
- Suborder: Polyphaga
- Infraorder: Scarabaeiformia
- Family: Scarabaeidae
- Genus: Microserica
- Species: M. hastata

Binomial name
- Microserica hastata Brenske, 1899

Species of beetle

Microserica hastata is a species of beetle of the family Scarabaeidae. It is found in Indonesia (Java).

== Description ==
Adults reach a length of about 7 mm. They have a short, rounded-oval, black, dull body. The head and pronotum are densely covered with long setae. The pronotum is strongly convex, very slightly rounded at the sides, scarcely wider posteriorly, with short, erect setae up to the middle. All the setae are yellowish-brown underneath.
