= Microserica pyrrhopoecila =

Scientific classification
- Kingdom: Animalia
- Phylum: Arthropoda
- Class: Insecta
- Order: Coleoptera
- Suborder: Polyphaga
- Infraorder: Scarabaeiformia
- Family: Scarabaeidae
- Genus: Microserica
- Species: M. pyrrhopoecila

Binomial name
- Microserica pyrrhopoecila Brenske, 1899

Species of beetle

Microserica pyrrhopoecila is a species of beetle of the family Scarabaeidae. It is found in Indonesia (Sumatra).

== Description ==
Adults reach a length of about 7–8 mm. They are dull and opalescent, the base colour on the underside is a dirty yellow, which is strongly darkened on the thorax and hips. The head is green or (less often) reddish-brown. The elytra are yellowish-brown with dark, jagged bands of various markings. There are individual weak bristle-like punctures on the frons. The pronotum is almost straight along the sides with quite strong setae, also along the anterior margin, slightly indented towards the front, the hind angles angular, the surface is rather strongly punctate with tiny hairs in the punctures and sparsely wrinkled. The elytra are densely and almost coarsely punctate in the striae, with tiny hairs, the intervals are narrow, distinctly raised, and smooth.
