= Microserica thai =

Scientific classification
- Kingdom: Animalia
- Phylum: Arthropoda
- Class: Insecta
- Order: Coleoptera
- Suborder: Polyphaga
- Infraorder: Scarabaeiformia
- Family: Scarabaeidae
- Genus: Microserica
- Species: M. thai

Binomial name
- Microserica thai Ahrens, 2002

Species of beetle

Microserica thai is a species of beetle of the family Scarabaeidae. It is found in Laos and Thailand.

== Description ==
Adults reach a length of about 3.7–4.7 mm. They have a broad, oval, moderately convex body. They are uniformly black or (very rarely) brown. The surface is dull (partly with a greenish or coppery iridescent sheen) and glabrous, except for the legs and the anterior labroclypeus.
