= Microserica vittigera =

Scientific classification
- Kingdom: Animalia
- Phylum: Arthropoda
- Class: Insecta
- Order: Coleoptera
- Suborder: Polyphaga
- Infraorder: Scarabaeiformia
- Family: Scarabaeidae
- Genus: Microserica
- Species: M. vittigera

Binomial name
- Microserica vittigera (Blanchard, 1850)

Synonyms
- Omaloplia vittigera Blanchard, 1850

Species of beetle

Microserica vittigera is a species of beetle of the family Scarabaeidae. It is found in Indonesia (Kalimantan).

== Description ==
Adults reach a length of about 5 mm. They are shiny, almost metallic, with the head and pronotum dark green and the elytra yellow with dark edges. The sides of the pronotum are curved.
