= Microserica feae =

Scientific classification
- Kingdom: Animalia
- Phylum: Arthropoda
- Class: Insecta
- Order: Coleoptera
- Suborder: Polyphaga
- Infraorder: Scarabaeiformia
- Family: Scarabaeidae
- Genus: Microserica
- Species: M. feae

Binomial name
- Microserica feae (Brenske, 1899)

Synonyms
- Neoserica feae Brenske, 1899

Species of beetle

Microserica feae is a species of beetle of the family Scarabaeidae. It is found in Myanmar.

== Description ==
Adults reach a length of about 4.8–5.4 mm. They have a moderately broad, oval, moderately convex body. The coloration is very variable. They are black, with the elytra yellow brown, and the suture interval and sides dark. The elytra sometimes has a dark transverse spot or the pronotum and elytra are uniformly yellowish-brown. The surface is dull and glabrous, except for the legs and the anterior labroclypeus.
