= Microsericaria stellata =

Scientific classification
- Kingdom: Animalia
- Phylum: Arthropoda
- Class: Insecta
- Order: Coleoptera
- Suborder: Polyphaga
- Infraorder: Scarabaeiformia
- Family: Scarabaeidae
- Genus: Microsericaria
- Species: M. stellata

Binomial name
- Microsericaria stellata (Arrow, 1946)

Synonyms
- Microserica stellata Arrow, 1946

Species of beetle

Microsericaria stellata is a species of beetle of the family Scarabaeidae. It is found in southern India.

== Description ==
They are black, with a slight greenish tinge, opaque above and beneath. The elytra are decorated in the middle with a small triangular yellow spot, its apex directed backwards. The legs are dark and shining.
