= Microserica larutensis =

Scientific classification
- Kingdom: Animalia
- Phylum: Arthropoda
- Class: Insecta
- Order: Coleoptera
- Suborder: Polyphaga
- Infraorder: Scarabaeiformia
- Family: Scarabaeidae
- Genus: Microserica
- Species: M. larutensis

Binomial name
- Microserica larutensis Ahrens, 2003

Species of beetle

Microserica larutensis is a species of beetle of the family Scarabaeidae. It is found in Malaysia.

== Description ==
Adults reach a length of about 5.7 mm. They have a black, oval body, partly with a greenish lustre. The anterior half of the elytra is reddish brown and the antennae are brown or black. The dorsal surface (except for the shiny labroclypeus and tibia) is dull and glabrous.
