= Microserica negrosiana =

Scientific classification
- Kingdom: Animalia
- Phylum: Arthropoda
- Class: Insecta
- Order: Coleoptera
- Suborder: Polyphaga
- Infraorder: Scarabaeiformia
- Family: Scarabaeidae
- Genus: Microserica
- Species: M. negrosiana

Binomial name
- Microserica negrosiana Brenske, 1899

Species of beetle

Microserica negrosiana is a species of beetle of the family Scarabaeidae. It is found in the Philippines (Negros).

== Description ==
Adults reach a length of about 5 mm. They are very similar to Microserica palawana, but the pronotum is somewhat shorter, and the elytra have alternately raised striations in the intervals. The colour also varies considerably. When the elytra are brownish, the suture and lateral margin are dark, and the striae are irregularly darkened. The clypeus is often yellowish-brown, as are the abdomen and the pygidium.
