= Microserica hieroglyphica =

Scientific classification
- Kingdom: Animalia
- Phylum: Arthropoda
- Class: Insecta
- Order: Coleoptera
- Suborder: Polyphaga
- Infraorder: Scarabaeiformia
- Family: Scarabaeidae
- Genus: Microserica
- Species: M. hieroglyphica

Binomial name
- Microserica hieroglyphica Ahrens, Lukic & Liu, 2023

Species of beetle

Microserica hieroglyphica is a species of beetle of the family Scarabaeidae. It is found in Laos.

== Description ==
Adults reach a length of about 6.4 mm. They have a yellowish brown, oval body, with the lateral elytral intervals, frons, two large pairs of spots on the pronotum and multiple dots on the elytra brown. The dorsal surface is dull and nearly glabrous.

== Etymology ==
The species name is derived from Latin hieroglyphicus (meaning hieroglyphic) and refers to the pattern of multiple dots on the elytra resembling hieroglyphic signs.
