= Microserica semperi =

Scientific classification
- Kingdom: Animalia
- Phylum: Arthropoda
- Class: Insecta
- Order: Coleoptera
- Suborder: Polyphaga
- Infraorder: Scarabaeiformia
- Family: Scarabaeidae
- Genus: Microserica
- Species: M. semperi

Binomial name
- Microserica semperi (Brenske, 1894)

Synonyms
- Serica semperi Brenske, 1894

Species of beetle

Microserica semperi is a species of beetle of the family Scarabaeidae. It is found in the Philippines (Luzon).

== Description ==
Adults reach a length of about 5.25 mm. The frons is finely punctate and the pronotum is widely punctate, with setae along the almost straight lateral margin. The scutellum is dark-coloured. The almost reddish, somewhat opalescent elytra are striated with several punctures, with weakly punctate spaces between them.
