= Microserica lugens =

Scientific classification
- Kingdom: Animalia
- Phylum: Arthropoda
- Clade: Pancrustacea
- Class: Insecta
- Order: Coleoptera
- Suborder: Polyphaga
- Infraorder: Scarabaeiformia
- Family: Scarabaeidae
- Genus: Microserica
- Species: M. lugens

Binomial name
- Microserica lugens Moser, 1915

Species of beetle

Microserica lugens is a species of beetle of the family Scarabaeidae. It is found in Malaysia (Sabah).

== Description ==
Adults reach a length of about 4.5 mm. They are dull, black above and blackish-brown below. The head is rather sparsely punctured. The antennae are yellowish-brown, with a darker club. The pronotum is moderately densely covered with punctures, which, like the punctures of the elytra, have minute setae. The anterior margin and the lateral margins also have a few setae. The elytra are punctate in the striae, while the weakly convex intervals are unpunctate.
