= Microserica latefemorata =

Scientific classification
- Kingdom: Animalia
- Phylum: Arthropoda
- Clade: Pancrustacea
- Class: Insecta
- Order: Coleoptera
- Suborder: Polyphaga
- Infraorder: Scarabaeiformia
- Family: Scarabaeidae
- Genus: Microserica
- Species: M. latefemorata

Binomial name
- Microserica latefemorata Moser, 1915

Species of beetle

Microserica latefemorata is a species of beetle of the family Scarabaeidae. It is found in Malaysia (Sarawak).

== Description ==
Adults reach a length of about 7 mm. The head and pronotum are blackish-green, while the elytra and pygidium are black. The underside is blackish-brown, with a greenish sheen in places. The frons is finely punctate, the punctures with minute setae. and the antennae are yellowish-brown. The pronotum is covered with moderately dense, fine, and minutely bristled punctation. The anterior margin and lateral margins also have some setae. The elytra are covered with irregularly spaced, very short-bristled punctures in the furrows. The spaces between them show a narrow, unpunctured stripe.
