= Microserica pentaphylla =

Scientific classification
- Kingdom: Animalia
- Phylum: Arthropoda
- Clade: Pancrustacea
- Class: Insecta
- Order: Coleoptera
- Suborder: Polyphaga
- Infraorder: Scarabaeiformia
- Family: Scarabaeidae
- Genus: Microserica
- Species: M. pentaphylla

Binomial name
- Microserica pentaphylla Moser, 1916

Species of beetle

Microserica pentaphylla is a species of beetle of the family Scarabaeidae. It is found in Indonesia (Java).

== Description ==
Adults reach a length of about 5.5–6 mm. The frons is blackish-green, sparsely or moderately densely covered with short-bristled punctures. Behind the suture is a row of strong setae. The pronotum is reddish-yellow posteriorly and blackish-green anteriorly. It is quite densely covered with punctures, which have extremely tiny setae. The anterior margin and the lateral margins are covered with erect setae and setae are sometimes also found on the disc, particularly behind the anterior margin. The elytra are reddish-yellow, while the suture and the sides are darker. They are slightly furrowed, the furrows marked with irregular rows of punctures. The weakly raised intervals are almost puncture-free. All punctures have tiny setae and a strong bristle is present on each side at the sutural angle.
