= Microserica limbata =

Scientific classification
- Kingdom: Animalia
- Phylum: Arthropoda
- Class: Insecta
- Order: Coleoptera
- Suborder: Polyphaga
- Infraorder: Scarabaeiformia
- Family: Scarabaeidae
- Genus: Microserica
- Species: M. limbata

Binomial name
- Microserica limbata (Brenske, 1894)

Synonyms
- Serica limbata Brenske, 1894

Species of beetle

Microserica limbata is a species of beetle of the family Scarabaeidae. It is found in Indonesia (Sumatra).

== Description ==
Adults reach a length of about 7-7.5 mm. The frons is dull and the thorax is dark, but a reddish-yellow colour shows through, especially on the sides, which then are almost the same colour as the elytra. The punctures are not discernible and the gently curved lateral margin is setate. The scutellum has a dark green colour that covers the suture and the entire lateral margin, widest in the middle of the sides, narrowest at the shoulder and the tip of the elytra. The remaining part is bright reddish-brown, punctured with narrow stripes of punctures and broad spaces between them.
