= Microserica rufolutea =

Scientific classification
- Kingdom: Animalia
- Phylum: Arthropoda
- Clade: Pancrustacea
- Class: Insecta
- Order: Coleoptera
- Suborder: Polyphaga
- Infraorder: Scarabaeiformia
- Family: Scarabaeidae
- Genus: Microserica
- Species: M. rufolutea

Binomial name
- Microserica rufolutea Moser, 1915

Species of beetle

Microserica rufolutea is a species of beetle of the family Scarabaeidae. It is found in the Philippines (Luzon).

== Description ==
Adults reach a length of about 6 mm. They are reddish-yellow, strongly tomentose and the legs are shiny. The frons is widely and finely punctured, dull, and shiny at the anterior angles. The antennae are reddish-yellow, with a somewhat darker club. The pronotum has moderately dense punctures and the lateral margins has setae. The elytra have rows of punctures, with the intervals only very weakly convex and sparsely punctured.
