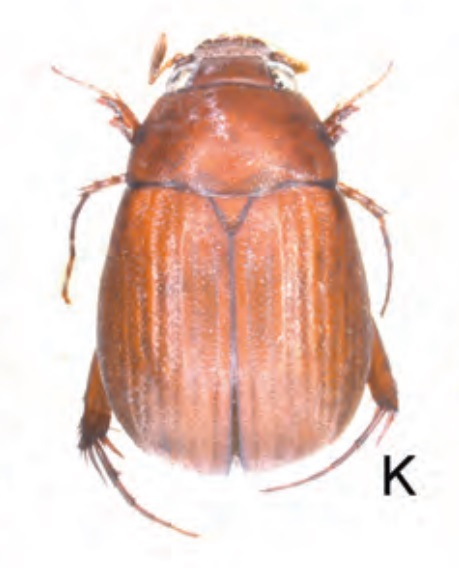

Scientific classification
- Kingdom: Animalia
- Phylum: Arthropoda
- Class: Insecta
- Order: Coleoptera
- Suborder: Polyphaga
- Infraorder: Scarabaeiformia
- Family: Scarabaeidae
- Genus: Microserica
- Species: M. fairmairei

Binomial name
- Microserica fairmairei Brenske, 1898

= Microserica fairmairei =

Species of beetle

Microserica fairmairei is a species of beetle of the family Scarabaeidae. It is found in India (Kerala, Tamil Nadu).

== Description ==
Adults reach a length of about 5.8 mm. They have an reddish brown, oval body. The elytra are weakly iridescent and the dorsal surface is dull and nearly glabrous.
