= Microserica sandakana =

Scientific classification
- Kingdom: Animalia
- Phylum: Arthropoda
- Clade: Pancrustacea
- Class: Insecta
- Order: Coleoptera
- Suborder: Polyphaga
- Infraorder: Scarabaeiformia
- Family: Scarabaeidae
- Genus: Microserica
- Species: M. sandakana

Binomial name
- Microserica sandakana Moser, 1921

Species of beetle

Microserica sandakana is a species of beetle of the family Scarabaeidae. It is found in Malaysia (Sabah).

== Description ==
Adults reach a length of about 5.5 mm. The head, pronotum and pygidium are green, while the elytra are red with black lines. The underside is blackish green and the legs are dark. The frons is subtly punctate and the antennae are reddish-yellow.
