= Microsericaria fenestrata =

Scientific classification
- Kingdom: Animalia
- Phylum: Arthropoda
- Class: Insecta
- Order: Coleoptera
- Suborder: Polyphaga
- Infraorder: Scarabaeiformia
- Family: Scarabaeidae
- Genus: Microsericaria
- Species: M. fenestrata

Binomial name
- Microsericaria fenestrata (Arrow, 1946)

Synonyms
- Microserica fenestrata Arrow, 1946

Species of beetle

Microsericaria fenestrata is a species of beetle of the family Scarabaeidae. It is found in southern India.

== Description ==
Adults reach a length of about 4.5 mm. They have a blackish, oval body. The elytra are yellowish brown with a black elongate spot in the middle and with black margins. The dorsal surface is dull and nearly glabrous.
