= Microserica striola =

Scientific classification
- Kingdom: Animalia
- Phylum: Arthropoda
- Class: Insecta
- Order: Coleoptera
- Suborder: Polyphaga
- Infraorder: Scarabaeiformia
- Family: Scarabaeidae
- Genus: Microserica
- Species: M. striola

Binomial name
- Microserica striola (Brenske, 1894)

Synonyms
- Serica striola Brenske, 1894

Species of beetle

Microserica striola is a species of beetle of the family Scarabaeidae. It is found in Indonesia (Sumatra).

== Description ==
Adults reach a length of about 5.75 mm. Except for the clypeus and legs, the body is dull, less so on the underside than on the upper side. A few setae are present laterally on the frons and the punctation is not discernible. The thorax has setate sides and the punctation is not discernible. The sides are broadly yellow, as is edge of the thorax. The center is dark green with three oblong yellow spots, two of which are close to the center on the anterior margin, and the third at the base in front of the scutellum. The scutellum is yellowish-brown, except for the dark corners. The elytra are yellow with dark streaks.
