= Microserica avicula =

Scientific classification
- Kingdom: Animalia
- Phylum: Arthropoda
- Class: Insecta
- Order: Coleoptera
- Suborder: Polyphaga
- Infraorder: Scarabaeiformia
- Family: Scarabaeidae
- Genus: Microserica
- Species: M. avicula

Binomial name
- Microserica avicula (Arrow, 1946)

Synonyms
- Aserica avicula Arrow, 1946

Species of beetle

Microserica avicula is a species of beetle of the family Scarabaeidae. It is found in Vietnam.

== Description ==
Adults reach a length of about 5 mm. They have a yellowish brown, oval body. The lateral intervals, frons, two large pairs of spots on the pronotum and multiple dots on the elytra are brown. The dorsal surface is dull and nearly glabrous.
