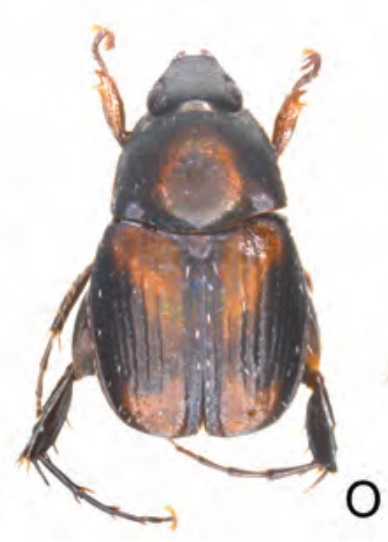

Scientific classification
- Kingdom: Animalia
- Phylum: Arthropoda
- Class: Insecta
- Order: Coleoptera
- Suborder: Polyphaga
- Infraorder: Scarabaeiformia
- Family: Scarabaeidae
- Genus: Anomioserica
- Species: A. tarsalis

Binomial name
- Anomioserica tarsalis (Frey, 1960)

Synonyms
- Microserica tarsalis Frey, 1960

= Anomioserica tarsalis =

Species of beetle

Anomioserica tarsalis is a species of beetle of the family Scarabaeidae. It is found in southern India.

== Description ==
Adults reach a length of about 4.25 mm. They have a dark brown to blackish, oval body, the head and pronotum with a greenish shine. The legs and elytra are yellowish brown, the latter with black margins and a dark long lateral spot. The dorsal surface has an iridescent shine and is glabrous, except for some white setae on the elytra.
