= Gastroserica fukiensis =

Scientific classification
- Kingdom: Animalia
- Phylum: Arthropoda
- Class: Insecta
- Order: Coleoptera
- Suborder: Polyphaga
- Infraorder: Scarabaeiformia
- Family: Scarabaeidae
- Genus: Gastroserica
- Species: G. fukiensis

Binomial name
- Gastroserica fukiensis Frey, 1972

Synonyms
- Microserica fukiensis; Microserica inornata Nomura, 1974

Species of beetle

Gastroserica fukiensis is a species of beetle of the family Scarabaeidae. It is found in China (Fujian, Guangdong, Guangxi, Guizhou, Hainan, Hubei, Jiangxi, Zhejiang) and Taiwan.

== Description ==
Adults reach a length of about 5.8 mm. They have a yellowish brown, oval body. The head and ventral surface (including abdomen and most of the pygidium) are blackish. The dorsal surface is dull and nearly glabrous.
