= Microserica malaccensis =

Scientific classification
- Kingdom: Animalia
- Phylum: Arthropoda
- Clade: Pancrustacea
- Class: Insecta
- Order: Coleoptera
- Suborder: Polyphaga
- Infraorder: Scarabaeiformia
- Family: Scarabaeidae
- Genus: Microserica
- Species: M. malaccensis

Binomial name
- Microserica malaccensis (Brenske, 1893)

Synonyms
- Serica (Microserica) malaccensis Brenske, 1893

Species of beetle

Microserica malaccensis is a species of beetle of the family Scarabaeidae. It is found in Cambodia, Malaysia and Thailand.

== Description ==
Adults reach a length of about 5 mm. They are dull and dark blackish-green, with the antennae, legs and an oval spot at the base of the elytra yellowish-brown. The clypeus is finely punctate with individual setae and the tomentum of the frons extends across the suture. The pronotum is slightly transverse, not projecting anteriorly in the middle, slightly rounded at the sides, widening posteriorly with sharp hind angles. The elytra are distinctly punctate in rows, the intervals slightly projecting, the egg-shaped spot reaching to the middle. The pygidium is convex and distinctly setate at the margin.
