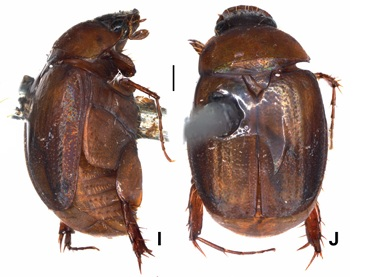

Scientific classification
- Kingdom: Animalia
- Phylum: Arthropoda
- Clade: Pancrustacea
- Class: Insecta
- Order: Coleoptera
- Suborder: Polyphaga
- Infraorder: Scarabaeiformia
- Family: Scarabaeidae
- Genus: Microserica
- Species: M. pusilla

Binomial name
- Microserica pusilla (Thunberg, 1818)

Synonyms
- Trichius pusillus Thunberg, 1818; Microserica leopoldiana Balthasar, 1932; Microserica leopoldiana debilis Balthasar, 1932; Microserica leopoldiana takengoniana Balthasar, 1932; Microserica compressipes tjibodasia Brenske, 1899; Microserica compressipes unicolor Brenske, 1899; Microserica compressipes var. unicolour Brenske, 1899; Microserica pulchella Brenske, 1899; Microserica brenskei Reitter, 1896; Melolontha compressipes Wiedemann, 1823

= Microserica pusilla =

Species of beetle

Microserica pusilla is a species of beetle of the family Scarabaeidae. It is found in Indonesia (Java, Sumatra), Malaysia and Thailand.

== Description ==
Adults reach a length of about 4–5 mm. They are dull, without opalescent luster, but silky-glossy and with faint tomentum. The underside is dark brownish-green silky-glossy. Above with a green head, green pronotum with a yellow base, and yellow, more or less broadly finely edged elytra, on which sometimes the yellow, sometimes the dark colour predominates.

== Taxonomy ==
The type locality given by Thunberg in 1818 (Cape of Good Hope) was later determined to be erroneous. The confusion between Cape and Java is not very unlikely, since these two ports on the East India route are the two main places where Thunberg collected on his trip abroad, staying in Cape for three years 1772–1775 and in Batavia for one month in 1775.
