= Microserica mindoroana =

Scientific classification
- Kingdom: Animalia
- Phylum: Arthropoda
- Class: Insecta
- Order: Coleoptera
- Suborder: Polyphaga
- Infraorder: Scarabaeiformia
- Family: Scarabaeidae
- Genus: Microserica
- Species: M. mindoroana

Binomial name
- Microserica mindoroana Brenske, 1899

Species of beetle

Microserica mindoroana is a species of beetle of the family Scarabaeidae. It is found in the Philippines (Mindoro).

== Description ==
Adults reach a length of about 5–6 mm. They have a rounded oval, dull body. The colouration is highly variable. Most specimens have a dark green iridescent head and a pronotum that is also entirely or partially dark green coloured, with reddish-brown elytra. However, entirely red and entirely dark specimens also occur. The clypeus is densely punctate, distinctly but not highly margined, straight anteriorly, rounded at the corners with a transverse row of setae. The frons and vertex are finely punctate, but very pruinous. The pronotum is also finely punctate, with a tiny hair in each puncture. The posterior corners are not rounded, the anterior margin straight in the middle, the marginal setae short and weak. The elytra are irregularly and rather coarsely punctate in the striae, the intervals almost devoid of punctures.
