= Microserica sexflabellata =

Scientific classification
- Kingdom: Animalia
- Phylum: Arthropoda
- Clade: Pancrustacea
- Class: Insecta
- Order: Coleoptera
- Suborder: Polyphaga
- Infraorder: Scarabaeiformia
- Family: Scarabaeidae
- Genus: Microserica
- Species: M. sexflabellata

Binomial name
- Microserica sexflabellata Moser, 1913

Species of beetle

Microserica sexflabellata is a species of beetle of the family Scarabaeidae. It is found in Indonesia (Java).

== Description ==
Adults reach a length of about 5–7 mm (0.20–0.28 in). They vary in colouration. Usually, the upper side is reddish-yellow, dull, with a green head and a green spot on the anterior margin of the pronotum, or with an entirely green pronotum, a blackish suture, and black elytral margins that are broadened in the middle. The underside is brown or blackish-green, and the legs are brown. However, uniformly dark red and black specimens of this species also occur. The head is sparsely punctate, and the shiny clypeus is covered with erect setae. Isolated setae are also found on the anterior part of the frons. The pronotum is finely and moderately densely punctate. The disc bears, on top of a few setae, a group of appressed yellow setae in front of the scutellum. The elytra are punctate-striate, the weakly convex intervals only sporadically punctate. All punctures bear tiny setae, the suture ends posteriorly on each side in a strong seta. The pygidium is dull in males, shiny in females andsparsely punctate. The thorax bears several setae on each side of the middle.
