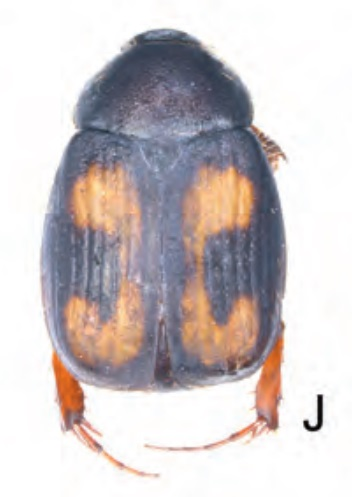

Scientific classification
- Kingdom: Animalia
- Phylum: Arthropoda
- Clade: Pancrustacea
- Class: Insecta
- Order: Coleoptera
- Suborder: Polyphaga
- Infraorder: Scarabaeiformia
- Family: Scarabaeidae
- Genus: Microsericaria
- Species: M. quadrinotata

Binomial name
- Microsericaria quadrinotata (Moser, 1915)

Synonyms
- Microserica quadrinotata Moser, 1915; Microserica arrowi Frey, 1972; Microsericaria arrowi

= Microsericaria quadrinotata =

Species of beetle

Microsericaria quadrinotata is a species of beetle of the family Scarabaeidae. It is found in southern India (Kerala, Tamil Nadu).

== Description ==
Adults reach a length of about 5-5.5 mm. The upper and lower surfaces are blackish, dull (with only the clypeus shiny) and tomentose. The underside sometimes has an opalescent sheen. The legs are brown and shiny. There are four large, irregular, but always symmetrical yellow spots on the elytra. In some specimens, the elytra are yellow with two elongate black spots. The pronotum and elytra are fringed with light brown hairs.
