= Microserica magnifica =

Scientific classification
- Kingdom: Animalia
- Phylum: Arthropoda
- Class: Insecta
- Order: Coleoptera
- Suborder: Polyphaga
- Infraorder: Scarabaeiformia
- Family: Scarabaeidae
- Genus: Microserica
- Species: M. magnifica

Binomial name
- Microserica magnifica Brenske, 1899

Species of beetle

Microserica magnifica is a species of beetle of the family Scarabaeidae. It is found in Malaysia (Sabah).

== Description ==
Adults reach a length of about 5.5–7 mm. The back of the head and the clypeus are greenish to brownish. The pronotum is scarcely projecting forward in the middle, with almost straight sides. The scutellum is pointedly elongate. The elytra are narrow, with light and dark stripes, the base light, the light stripes ending before the apex, always narrow but in very varying numbers. The pygidium is hairy only at the apex and somewhat convex.
