= Oxyserica truncata =

Scientific classification
- Kingdom: Animalia
- Phylum: Arthropoda
- Class: Insecta
- Order: Coleoptera
- Suborder: Polyphaga
- Infraorder: Scarabaeiformia
- Family: Scarabaeidae
- Genus: Oxyserica
- Species: O. truncata

Binomial name
- Oxyserica truncata (Brenske, 1898)

Synonyms
- Autoserica truncata Brenske, 1898; Serica truncata; Microserica truncata; Microserica cribriceps Moser, 1915

Species of beetle

Oxyserica truncata is a species of beetle of the family Scarabaeidae. It is found in India (Sikkim, Darjeeling).

== Description ==
Adults reach a length of about 5.5-6.2 mm. They have a light reddish-brown to dark brown, oblong-oval body. The head, scutellum and front of the pronotum are coppery green.
