= Microsericaria atropicta =

Scientific classification
- Kingdom: Animalia
- Phylum: Arthropoda
- Clade: Pancrustacea
- Class: Insecta
- Order: Coleoptera
- Suborder: Polyphaga
- Infraorder: Scarabaeiformia
- Family: Scarabaeidae
- Genus: Microsericaria
- Species: M. atropicta

Binomial name
- Microsericaria atropicta (Moser, 1915)

Synonyms
- Microserica atropicta Moser, 1915

Species of beetle

Microsericaria atropicta is a species of beetle of the family Scarabaeidae. It is found in southern India.

== Description ==
Adults reach a length of about 6 mm. The frons and pronotum are blackish-green. The head is wrinkled and punctured with setae. The antennae are yellowish-brown, with a darker club. The pronotum is moderately densely punctate, and the anterior margin and lateral margins are setose. Setae are also found behind the anterior margin and between the middle and lateral margin. The elytra are yellow, bordered in black. A black longitudinal band begins at the posterior margin and ends slightly before the middle, widening here. At this point, the sutural band and the lateral margin bands are also widened, so that sometimes a black transverse band is formed. The elytra have rows of punctures, with the weakly convex intervals sparsely punctate.
