= Microsericaria quadripunctata =

Scientific classification
- Kingdom: Animalia
- Phylum: Arthropoda
- Class: Insecta
- Order: Coleoptera
- Suborder: Polyphaga
- Infraorder: Scarabaeiformia
- Family: Scarabaeidae
- Genus: Microsericaria
- Species: M. quadripunctata

Binomial name
- Microsericaria quadripunctata (Brenske, 1896)

Synonyms
- Microserica quadripunctata Brenske, 1896

Species of beetle

Microsericaria quadripunctata is a species of beetle of the family Scarabaeidae. It is found in India (Tetara, Konbir, Chota-Nagpore).

== Description ==
Adults reach a length of about 4.8-5 mm. They are black, with the pronotum and elytra dull and strongly opalescent. The head (but especially the thorax) and the legs are shiny. The clypeus is more strongly margined anteriorly than on the sides, and densely, coarsely wrinkled-punctate, with coarser setate punctures in between. The indistinct suture forms an obtuse angle, the frons behind it densely and coarsely punctate, the punctures hardly smaller, with a smooth longitudinal line in the middle that begins at the suture, the punctures becoming more widely spaced towards the vertex. The pronotum has the same punctation as the frons, the anterior angles are pointedly projecting, the anterior margin therefore deeply indented, the posterior angles slightly rounded, bristles are present in deeper recesses on the anterior and lateral margins. In the middle towards the base is an indistinct longitudinal line. The tip of the scutellum is slightly raised. The elytra have nine or ten deeply punctate striae, which become less dense towards the margin. The punctures in the striae are confused, the raised intervals are smooth, with only a few punctures. Each elytron has a red spot near the shoulder and a somewhat larger one in front of the apex. The pygidium is coarsely and widely punctate like the thorax.
