= Microserica moultoni =

Scientific classification
- Kingdom: Animalia
- Phylum: Arthropoda
- Clade: Pancrustacea
- Class: Insecta
- Order: Coleoptera
- Suborder: Polyphaga
- Infraorder: Scarabaeiformia
- Family: Scarabaeidae
- Genus: Microserica
- Species: M. moultoni

Binomial name
- Microserica moultoni Moser, 1911

Species of beetle

Microserica moultoni is a species of beetle of the family Scarabaeidae. It is found in Malaysia (Sabah).

== Description ==
Adults reach a length of about 7.5 mm. The head is green, shiny, sparsely punctured and covered with some erect yellow setae. The frons is green, dull, covered with scattered punctures and with a few setae along the suture. The antennae are yellowish. The pronotum and scutellum are also green. Along the lateral margins of the pronotum is a row of yellow setae. The surfaces of the pronotum and scutellum are sparsely punctured, and each puncture has a tiny setae. The elytra are brownish-yellow, with punctured striae. The striae are broad and black, so that on the broad lateral and posterior margins of the elytra there are six narrow black longitudinal bands. The punctures of the elytra also have tiny setae.
