= Microserica lineolata =

Scientific classification
- Kingdom: Animalia
- Phylum: Arthropoda
- Clade: Pancrustacea
- Class: Insecta
- Order: Coleoptera
- Suborder: Polyphaga
- Infraorder: Scarabaeiformia
- Family: Scarabaeidae
- Genus: Microserica
- Species: M. lineolata

Binomial name
- Microserica lineolata Moser, 1915

Species of beetle

Microserica lineolata is a species of beetle of the family Scarabaeidae. It is found in Malaysia (Sarawak).

== Description ==
Adults reach a length of about 5.5 mm. They are dull and the head, pronotum and scutellum are green, while the elytra are yellowish-brown with black lateral and posterior margins. The elytral striae are blackish. The pygidium and underside are dark with a slightly greenish sheen. The head is sparsely punctate and covered with scattered setae. The pronotum is densely covered with minutely setate punctures and the setate lateral margins are weakly curved. The elytra are punctate in the striae and the weakly convex intervals are unpunctate.
