= Microserica abbreviata =

Scientific classification
- Kingdom: Animalia
- Phylum: Arthropoda
- Class: Insecta
- Order: Coleoptera
- Suborder: Polyphaga
- Infraorder: Scarabaeiformia
- Family: Scarabaeidae
- Genus: Microserica
- Species: M. abbreviata

Binomial name
- Microserica abbreviata Brenske, 1899

Species of beetle

Microserica abbreviata is a species of beetle of the family Scarabaeidae. It is found in the Philippines (Mindanao).

== Description ==
Adults reach a length of about 5 mm. They have a rounded oval, dull, brownish-red body, with a greenish tinge, especially on the head, the middle of the pronotum and the sides of the elytra.
