= Microserica palawana =

Scientific classification
- Kingdom: Animalia
- Phylum: Arthropoda
- Class: Insecta
- Order: Coleoptera
- Suborder: Polyphaga
- Infraorder: Scarabaeiformia
- Family: Scarabaeidae
- Genus: Microserica
- Species: M. palawana

Binomial name
- Microserica palawana Brenske, 1899

Species of beetle

Microserica palawana is a species of beetle of the family Scarabaeidae. It is found in the Philippines (Palawan).

== Description ==
Adults reach a length of about 5 mm. The head is green and the pronotum and elytra are mostly brown, the latter with a darker margin, darker rows of punctures, or entirely dark, with a silky sheen underneath. The clypeus is rounded at the sides, very finely punctured with individual setae, and only shiny in the anterior part, as the tomentum extends beyond the suture. The frons is broad. The pronotum is not projecting forward in the middle anteriorly, only slightly widened posteriorly, setate at the margin, the posterior angles not rounded. The scutellum is large. The elytra are densely and finely punctured in the impressed striae, but the punctures are not arranged in rows. The intervals are narrow and strongly convex, and are further emphasized by the darkening of the rows of punctures. The pygidium is pointed.
