= Microserica viridifrons =

Scientific classification
- Kingdom: Animalia
- Phylum: Arthropoda
- Clade: Pancrustacea
- Class: Insecta
- Order: Coleoptera
- Suborder: Polyphaga
- Infraorder: Scarabaeiformia
- Family: Scarabaeidae
- Genus: Microserica
- Species: M. viridifrons

Binomial name
- Microserica viridifrons Moser, 1922

Species of beetle

Microserica viridifrons is a species of beetle of the family Scarabaeidae. It is found in the Philippines (Masbate).

== Description ==
Adults reach a length of about 5 mm. They are red and opaque. The head is very sparsely setose and the frons is subtly punctate. The antennae are red. The pronotum is quite densely subtly punctate. The elytra are punctate and more or less blackish, the interstices sparsely covered with punctures.
