= Microserica simplex =

Scientific classification
- Kingdom: Animalia
- Phylum: Arthropoda
- Class: Insecta
- Order: Coleoptera
- Suborder: Polyphaga
- Infraorder: Scarabaeiformia
- Family: Scarabaeidae
- Genus: Microserica
- Species: M. simplex

Binomial name
- Microserica simplex Arrow, 1946

Species of beetle

Microserica simplex is a species of beetle of the family Scarabaeidae. It is found in Laos, Myanmar, Thailand and China (Yunnan).

== Description ==
Adults reach a length of about 6.4 mm. They have an oval body. The ventral surface, part of the antennae and legs are yellowish brown, while the abdomen and antennal club are brown. The dorsal surface is reddish brown, nearly glabrous and dull, sometimes partly iridescent shiny.
