= Gastroserica varians =

Scientific classification
- Kingdom: Animalia
- Phylum: Arthropoda
- Class: Insecta
- Order: Coleoptera
- Suborder: Polyphaga
- Infraorder: Scarabaeiformia
- Family: Scarabaeidae
- Genus: Gastroserica
- Species: G. varians

Binomial name
- Gastroserica varians (Moser, 1915)

Synonyms
- Microserica varians Moser, 1915

Species of beetle

Gastroserica varians is a species of beetle of the family Scarabaeidae. It is found in China (Guangxi, Yunnan), Laos and Vietnam.

== Description ==
Adults reach a length of about 5.3 mm. They have an oval body. The colouration ranges from entirely yellow (in females) to entirely black (in some males). The legs, center of the elytra, margins of the pronotum, labroclypeus and part of the antennae are yellowish. The dorsal surface is iridescent shiny and nearly glabrous.
