= Microserica nigrolineata =

Scientific classification
- Kingdom: Animalia
- Phylum: Arthropoda
- Clade: Pancrustacea
- Class: Insecta
- Order: Coleoptera
- Suborder: Polyphaga
- Infraorder: Scarabaeiformia
- Family: Scarabaeidae
- Genus: Microserica
- Species: M. nigrolineata

Binomial name
- Microserica nigrolineata Moser, 1911

Species of beetle

Microserica nigrolineata is a species of beetle of the family Scarabaeidae. It is found in Malaysia (Sabah).

== Description ==
Adults reach a length of about 5 mm. The head is dark green, with the frons sparsely punctate and with individual erect brown setae. The pronotum is sparsely punctate, the punctures with minute setae. The lateral margins, like those of the elytra, are extensively covered with setae in some specimens. The pronotum is either entirely green or the posterior half is reddish-brown. The scutellum is olive-green. The elytra are punctate in striae, with the punctures barely visibly setate. The striae are black, with the weakly convex intervals yellowish-brown. The lateral and posterior margins are broadly bordered in black.
