= Microserica singalangia =

Scientific classification
- Kingdom: Animalia
- Phylum: Arthropoda
- Class: Insecta
- Order: Coleoptera
- Suborder: Polyphaga
- Infraorder: Scarabaeiformia
- Family: Scarabaeidae
- Genus: Microserica
- Species: M. singalangia

Binomial name
- Microserica singalangia Brenske, 1899

Species of beetle

Microserica singalangia is a species of beetle of the family Scarabaeidae. It is found in Indonesia (Sumatra).

== Description ==
Adults reach a length of about 4.5–5 mm. They are shiny, almost metallic. The colour varies greatly, ranging from yellowish-brown to dark blue-green. The pronotum is straight at the sides, the hind angles are angular, the surface is finely punctate without wrinkles, the setae on the anterior margin are distinct. The scutellum is small, pointed with an indistinct longitudinal line. On the elytra, the punctate striae are narrow, the punctures are fine and not arranged in rows. The intervals are alternately slightly raised and smooth.
