= Microserica splendidula =

Scientific classification
- Kingdom: Animalia
- Phylum: Arthropoda
- Class: Insecta
- Order: Coleoptera
- Suborder: Polyphaga
- Infraorder: Scarabaeiformia
- Family: Scarabaeidae
- Genus: Microserica
- Species: M. splendidula

Binomial name
- Microserica splendidula (Fabricius, 1801)

Synonyms
- Melolontha splendidula Fabricius, 1801

Species of beetle

Microserica splendidula is a species of beetle of the family Scarabaeidae. It is found in Indonesia (Sumatra, Nias, Malacca).

== Description ==
Adults reach a length of about 6.5–6.7 mm. They have a short, egg-shaped, oval body. The colouration is very variable, ranging from dark brown to yellowish. The head and usually also the pronotum are greenish, and the elytra are always dark-bordered. The legs are black to reddish-brown. The upper surface is dull tomentose and glabrous, except for the labroclypeus.
