= Jochen Martens =

German zoologist (born 1941)

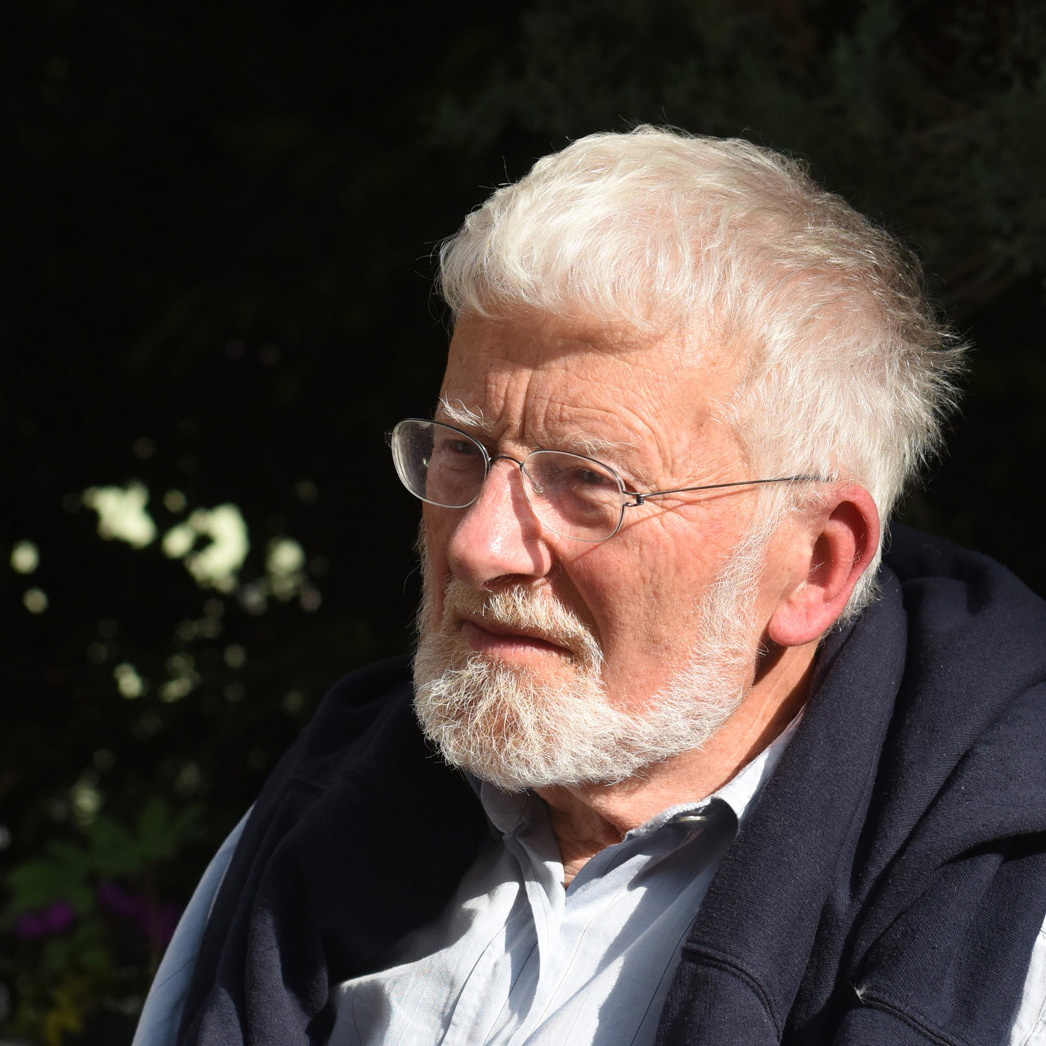
Jochen Martens

Jochen Martens (born 1941 in Jena) is a German zoologist, whose areas of expertise are primarily in ornithology and arachnology. He taught at the Johannes Gutenberg University Mainz from 1976 to 2012 and is considered a pioneer in the use of bioacoustics for studying the evolution of songbirds and one of the most recognized researchers in the field of Opiliones (harvestmen).

== Life ==
Jochen Martens grew up in Jena, Weimar, Berlin, Bonn Bad-Godesberg, and Stuttgart. From 1962 to 1967, he studied biology and chemistry at Johannes Gutenberg University Mainz, earning his doctorate in 1968 under Rudolf Braun on an arachnological topic. In 1969/70, Martens spent 15 months in Nepal on a post-doctoral fellowship from the DAAD. Since 1971, he has been an assistant at the Institute of Zoology at Johannes Gutenberg University Mainz, where he habilitated in 1975 on an ornithological topic. In 1976, he initially took up an assistant professorship at the same institute, followed by a full professorship in 1978. Martens led the "Systematic Zoology" research group at his institute. After his retirement in 2006, he remained associated with the institute as a senior professor until 2011. Jochen Martens lives in Mainz, is married, and has three children.

== Research ==
The two main research areas of Jochen Martens are ornithology and arachnology. His research projects include the formation of local dialects in the songs of songbirds as an evolutionary factor, the investigation of species diversity and speciation in the Himalayas and other high mountain ranges of Asia and Europe, and the systematics and phylogeny of arachnids. To date, Martens has described 298 new species, numerous new genera, and three new families of harvestmen (Nipponopsalididae, 1976, Fissiphalliidae, 1988, and Suthepiidae, 2020).

=== Ornithology ===
In ornithology, Martens researched the evolution and taxonomy of songbirds using bioacoustic, later genetic, methods. His bioacoustic work extended the classical description of the geographical variation of birds by adding a bioacoustic component. Martens defined the Tembrock's "Regiolect" more precisely, introduced the term "Mikrolekt" (2000), and thereby narrowed down the overly diverse term "dialect."

In the field of Aves, he described three new species and four new subspecies.

=== Arachnology ===
In arachnology, Jochen Martens focused on the systematics and phylogeny of arachnids. Research focus includes Opiliones (harvestmen), especially the families in the Eurasian region. In the field of Arachnida, Martens described 321 taxa, including 262 Opiliones taxa (231 species, 29 genera, 3 families), 40 Araneae species (spiders), and 19 Acari species (mites).

Martens gained attention beyond the scientific community in 2020 when he named a new genus and species of harvestmen, Thunbergia gretae, after Swedish climate activist Greta Thunberg.

=== Travels ===
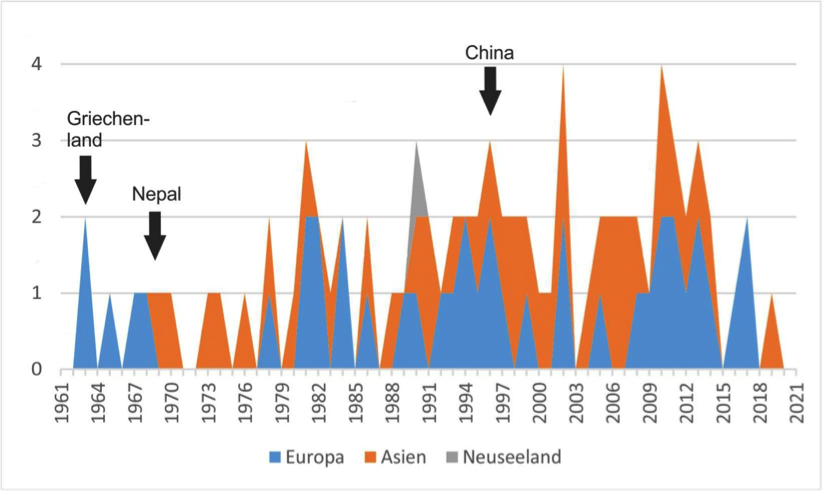
Jochen Martens' travels by continents/countries. Arrows indicate the first journeys to respective countries.

Jochen Martens' extensive travel for research purposes took him to 27 countries. He undertook 40 research trips within Europe and 40 more to Asia and New Zealand, spending a total of 2631 days and 9% of his life on expeditions. Manfred Grasshoff, former de facto curator of the arachnological collection at the Senckenberg Museum in Frankfurt am Main, referred to Jochen Martens as the "last great research traveler of our time."

The focus of his travels and research was the Himalayas (Nepal and China). His Nepal travels between 1969 and 2005 resulted in more than 300 publications by colleagues around the globe, known as the Results of the Himalaya Expeditions of J. Martens. Besides his activities in Nepal, Jochen Martens also conducted research in Iran, the Caucasus, Central Asia (Kyrgyzstan and Kazakhstan), Western and Eastern Siberia, the Philippines, large parts of South, Southeast, and East Asia, as well as the Mediterranean region.

== Teaching ==
Throughout his academic career, Martens was always committed to teaching. He gave lectures on topics such as Animal blueprints and phyla, Animals in soil, The origin of species, mimicry, and Himalayan ecosystem. His teaching repertoire also included beginner and advanced zoological exercises on the morphology and anatomy of all animal phyla and animal identification exercises. His regular laboratory and field experiments focused on the bioacoustics of birds. He was also known for his zoological excursions, particularly those on bird bioacoustics (birdsong excursions). During his tenure as a professor, Martens supervised around twelve doctoral students.

== Publications ==
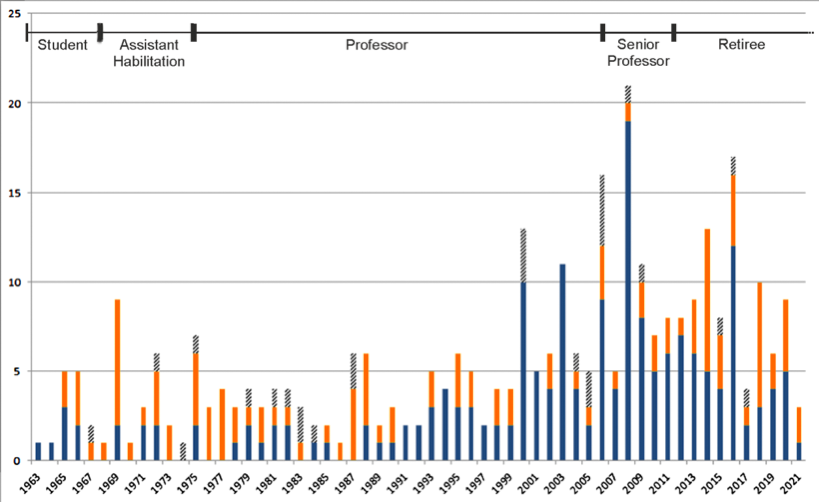
Number of publications by Jochen Martens from 1963 to 2021 and research areas (blue – Aves: 188, orange – Arthropoda: 114, hatched – Miscellaneous: 27)

Jochen Martens published 329 scientific papers, 188 on ornithological topics, 114 on arthropods (mainly harvestmen), and 27 on various topics, such as high mountain research and flower biology.

The 1978 volume Spinnentiere, Arachnida: Weberknechte, Opiliones in the series Die Tierwelt Deutschlands is still considered a standard work, a "benchmark for publications on Opiliones worldwide" and an "arachnological milestone". Jochen Martens is credited with ending the "dark age of harvestman research and initiating the era of 'opilionological enlightenment'".

On Jochen Martens' 80th birthday, a special issue of the international journal Zootaxa was published on June 10, 2021, dedicated to him, edited by Peter Jäger, Peter J. Schwendinger, and William A. Shear.

== Memberships and honors ==
Since 1961, Jochen Martens has been a member of the German Ornithologists' Society, where he served as Secretary-General from 1980 to 1987.

Since 1962, Jochen Martens has been a member of the Verein für vaterländische Naturkunde in Württemberg (now called the Gesellschaft für Naturkunde in Württemberg), the Ornithological Society in Bavaria, and the Verein Thüringer Ornithologen.

Since 1973, Jochen Martens has been an honorary associate at the Senckenberg Research Institute and Natural History Museum in Frankfurt/M in arachnology. He is also an honorary associate of the Senckenberg Natural History Collections Dresden in the ornithology team.

Since the 1980s, Jochen Martens has been a fellow of the International Ornithologists' Union (IOU).

In 1984, Jochen Martens was a founding member of the Oriental Bird Club (OBC), in which he remains a member to this day.

Since the early 1990s, Jochen Martens has been a member of the Berlin Circle of Editors and Contributors of the Atlas of Palearctic Birds. To continue this atlas project, the Erwin Stresemann Society for Palearctic Avifaunistics was founded in 1994, with Jochen Martens serving as president from 1997 to 2014 and as vice president from 2015 to 2021.

From 1993 to 2006, Jochen Martens was a trusted lecturer for the German National Academic Foundation.

Since 1997, Jochen Martens has been a member of the Arachnological Society, where he has served on the scientific advisory board of the Arachnological Bulletins since then.

In 2005, the German Ornithologists' Society awarded Jochen Martens the Ornithologists' Prize for his research in Asia and his lifetime achievements.

In 2006, Hainan Normal University in Haikou, China, awarded Jochen Martens the title of Visiting Professor.

== Taxa ==
=== Taxa named after Martens ===
List of animal genera, species, and subspecies named after Jochen Martens. The list comprises 230 taxa, consisting of 13 genera, 217 species, and three subspecies. A map shows the geographical distribution of the taxa named after Jochen Martens.

Taxa named after Jochen Martens
Class	Order	Family	Genus	Species / Subspecies	Author	Year
Arachnida	Acari	Licnodamaeidae	Malgacheliodes	martensi	Ermilov, Hogo-Coetzee and Khaustov	2021
Arachnida	Acari	Steganacaridae	Plonaphacarus	martensi	Niedbala	2014
Arachnida	Araneae	Agelenidae	Himalcoeolotes	martensi	Wang	2002
Arachnida	Araneae	Amaurobiidae	Himalmartensus	martensi	Wang and Zhu	2008
Arachnida	Araneae	Ctenidae	Ctenus	martensi	Jäger	2012
Arachnida	Araneae	Dysderidae	Dysdera	martensi	Dunin	1991
Arachnida	Araneae	Dysderidae	Harpactea	martensi	Dunin	1991
Arachnida	Araneae	Halonoproctidae	Conothele	martensi	Decae, Schwendinger and Hongpadharakiree	2021
Arachnida	Araneae	Hersiliidae	Hersilia	martensi	Baehr	1993
Arachnida	Araneae	Leptonetidae	Leptonetela	martensi	Zhu and Li	2021
Arachnida	Araneae	Linyphiidae	Agyneta	martensi	Tanasevitch	2006
Arachnida	Araneae	Linyphiidae	Himalaphantes	martensi	Thaler	1987
Arachnida	Araneae	Linyphiidae	Martensinus	annulatus	Wunderlich	1973
Arachnida	Araneae	Linyphiidae	Martensinus	micronetiformis	Wunderlich	1973
Arachnida	Araneae	Linyphiidae	Mughiphantes	martensi	Tanasevitch	2006
Arachnida	Araneae	Linyphiidae	Walckenaeria	martensi	Wunderlich	1972
Arachnida	Araneae	Lycosidae	Pardosa	martensi	Buchar	1978
Arachnida	Araneae	Oonopidae	Camptoscaphiella	martensi	Baehr	2010
Arachnida	Araneae	Oonopidae	Himalayana	martensi	Grismado	2014
Arachnida	Araneae	Pacullidae	Furcembolus	martensi	Jiang and Li	2021
Arachnida	Araneae	Pholcidae	Artema	martensi	Huber	2021
Arachnida	Araneae	Pholcidae	Belisana	martensi	Yao and Li	2013
Arachnida	Araneae	Salticidae	Chalcoscirtus	martensi	Zabka	1980
Arachnida	Araneae	Salticidae	Synagelides	martensi	Bohdanowicz	1987
Arachnida	Araneae	Sparassidae	Martensikara	jocheni	Jäger	2021
Arachnida	Araneae	Sparassidae	Martensopoda	transversa	Jäger	2006
Arachnida	Araneae	Sparassidae	Pseudopoda	martensi	Jäger	2001
Arachnida	Araneae	Spatiatoridae	Spatiator	martensi	Wunderlich	2006
Arachnida	Araneae	Symphytognathidae	Iardinis	martensi	Brignoli	1978
Arachnida	Araneae	Tetrablemmidae	Brignoliella	martensi	Brignoli	1972
Arachnida	Araneae	Thomisidae	Xysticus	martensi	Ono	1978
Arachnida	Araneae	Zodariidae	Malinella	martensi	Ono	1983
Arachnida	Araneae	Zodariidae	Suffasia	martensi	Ono	2006
Arachnida	Opiliones	Biantidae	Stenostygnus	martensi	Mamani, Porto, Iglesias and Perez-Gonzalez	2021
Arachnida	Opiliones	Cladonychiidae	Sinonychia	martensi	Zhang and Derkarabetian	2021
Arachnida	Opiliones	Cryptogeobiidae	Spinopilar	jocheni	Kury and Araujo	2021
Arachnida	Opiliones	Cryptogeobiidae	Spinopilar	martialis	Kury and Araujo	2021
Arachnida	Opiliones	Cryptogeobiidae	Spinopilar	magistralis	Kury and Araujo	2021
Arachnida	Opiliones	Fissiphalliidae	Fissiphallius	martensi	Pinto-da-Rocha	2004
Arachnida	Opiliones	Gonyleptidae	Marayniocus	martensi	Acosta	2006
Arachnida	Opiliones	Gonyleptidae	Pseudopachylus	martensi	Kury	2006
Arachnida	Opiliones	Nemastomatidae	Caucnemastoma	martensi	Snegovaya	2011
Arachnida	Opiliones	Nemastomatidae	Martensolasma	catrina	Cruz-Lopez	2017
Arachnida	Opiliones	Nemastomatidae	Martensolasma	jocheni	Shear	2006
Arachnida	Opiliones	Neopilionidae	Martensopsalis	dogny	Giribet and Baker	2021
Arachnida	Opiliones	Oncopodidae	Martensiellus	tenuipalpus	Schwendinger	2006
Arachnida	Opiliones	Phalangiidae	Euphalangium	martensi	Das and Bastawade	2006
Arachnida	Opiliones	Phalangiidae	Homolophus	martensi	Staręga	1986
Arachnida	Opiliones	Phalangiidae	Metaphalangium	martensi	Mitov, Perkovsky and Dunlop	2021
Arachnida	Opiliones	Phalangiidae	Phalangium	martensi	Snegovaya, Cokendolpher and Zamani	2021
Arachnida	Opiliones	Phalangodidae	Texella	martensi	Ubick	2021
Arachnida	Opiliones	Sabaconidae	Sabacon	martensi	Tsurusaki and Song	1993
Arachnida	Opiliones	Sclerosomatidae	† Mesobunus	martensi	Huang, Selden and Dunlop	2009
Arachnida	Opiliones	Sclerosomatidae	Umbopilio	martensi	Klimes	2006
Arachnida	Opiliones	Sironidae	Cyphophthalmus	martensi	Karaman	2009
Arachnida	Opiliones	Stygnidae	Jime	praecursor	Villareal, Kury and Colmenares	2021
Arachnida	Opiliones	Trogulidae	Anarthrotarsus	martensi	Šilhavý	1967
Arachnida	Opiliones	Trogulidae	Trogulus	martensi	Chemini	1983
Arachnida	Pseudoscorpiones	Cheliferidae	Dactylochelifer	martensi	Dashdamirov	2006
Arachnida	Pseudoscorpiones	Chernetidae	Ceriochernes	martensi	Beier	1974
Arachnida	Pseudoscorpiones	Neobisiidae	Stenohya	martensi	Schawaller	1987
Arachnida	Scorpiones	Buthidae	Ananteris	martensi	Lourenço	2021
Arachnida	Scorpiones	Buthidae	Himalayotityobuthus	martensi	Lourenço	1997
Aves	Passeriformes	Paridae	Parus (Periparus)	ater martensi	Eck	1998
Crustacea	Copepoda	Phyllognathopodidae	Parbatocamptus	jochenmartensi	Dumont and Maas	1988
Crustacea	Isopoda	Philosciidae	Rennelloscia	martensi	Vandel	1973
Crustacea	Isopoda	Trachelipodidae	Pseudorthometopon	martensi	Schmalfuss	1986
Insecta	Archaeognatha	Meinertellidae	Machilontus	martensi	Sturm	1990
Insecta	Coleoptera	Alleculidae	Isomira	martensi	Novák	2014
Insecta	Coleoptera	Anthicidae	Tomoderus	martensi	Uhmann	1982
Insecta	Coleoptera	Brentidae	Conapium	martensi	Korotyaev	1987
Insecta	Coleoptera	Cantharidae	Falsopodabrus	martensi	Wittmer	1979
Insecta	Coleoptera	Cantharidae	Laemoglyptus	martensi	Kazentsev	2009
Insecta	Coleoptera	Carabidae	Amara	martensi	Hieke	1981
Insecta	Coleoptera	Carabidae	Amerizus	martensi	Queinnec and Perreau	2002
Insecta	Coleoptera	Carabidae	Calathus	martensi	Schmidt	1999
Insecta	Coleoptera	Carabidae	Calosoma davidi	martensi	Paulus	1971
Insecta	Coleoptera	Carabidae	Cychropsis	martensi	Heinz	1994
Insecta	Coleoptera	Carabidae	Elaphropus	martensi	Baehr	2016
Insecta	Coleoptera	Carabidae	Gunvorita	martensi	Casale	1985
Insecta	Coleoptera	Carabidae	Laemostenus (Antisphodrus)	martensi	Casale	1980
Insecta	Coleoptera	Carabidae	Nebria	martensi	Huber and Schmidt	2012
Insecta	Coleoptera	Carabidae	Laemostenus (Pristonychus)	martensianum	Casale	1988
Insecta	Coleoptera	Carabidae	Pterostichus	martensi	Straneo	1977
Insecta	Coleoptera	Carabidae	Tiruka	martensi	Queinnec and Perreau	2002
Insecta	Coleoptera	Carabidae	Trechus	martensi	Deuve and Hodebert	1991
Insecta	Coleoptera	Carabidae	Trichotichnus	martensi	Kataev and Schmidt	2017
Insecta	Coleoptera	Carabidae	Zabrus	martensi	Freude	1986
Insecta	Coleoptera	Cholevidae	Catops	martensi	Perreau	1992
Insecta	Coleoptera	Chrysomelidae	Aphthonaria	martensi	Medvedev	1990
Insecta	Coleoptera	Chrysomelidae	Apophylia	martensi	Bezdĕk	2003
Insecta	Coleoptera	Chrysomelidae	Labidostomis	martensi	Medvedev	1983
Insecta	Coleoptera	Chrysomelidae	Martensomela	aptera	Medvedev	1984
Insecta	Coleoptera	Chrysomelidae	Monolepta	martensi	Medvedev	1992
Insecta	Coleoptera	Chrysomelidae	Nodina	martensi	Medvedev	1992
Insecta	Coleoptera	Chrysomelidae	Oomorphoides	martensi	Medvedev	1990
Insecta	Coleoptera	Chrysomelidae	Pyrrhalta	martensi	Medvedev and Sprecher-Uebersax	1999
Insecta	Coleoptera	Chrysomelidae	Taizonia	martensi	Medvedev	1984
Insecta	Coleoptera	Chrysomelidae	Taumacera (sub Acroxena)	martensi	Medvedev	1990
Insecta	Coleoptera	Coccinellidae	Scymnus	martensi	Canepari	1997
Insecta	Coleoptera	Cryptophagidae	Cryptophagus	martensi	Sen Gupta	1980
Insecta	Coleoptera	Curculionidae	Conapion	martensi	Korotyaev	1987
Insecta	Coleoptera	Curculionidae	Limnobaris	martensi	Korotyaev	2014
Insecta	Coleoptera	Curculionidae	Niphadonyx	martensi	Zherichin	1987
Insecta	Coleoptera	Dermestidae	Dermestes undulatus	martensi	Kalik	
Insecta	Coleoptera	Dytiscidae	Hydaticus	martensi	Wewalka	1972
Insecta	Coleoptera	Dytiscidae	Hydroporus	martensi	Brancucci	1981
Insecta	Coleoptera	Elateridae	Dima	martensi	Schimmel and Platia	1991
Insecta	Coleoptera	Elateridae	Melanotus	martensi	Platia and Schimmel	2001
Insecta	Coleoptera	Elateridae	Penia	martensi	Schimmel and Platia	1991
Insecta	Coleoptera	Elateridae	Silesis	martensi	Platia and Schimmel	1991
Insecta	Coleoptera	Geotrupidae	Geotrupes	martensi	Krikken	1981
Insecta	Coleoptera	Heteroceridae	Augyles (sub Heterocerus)	martensi	Mascagni	1990
Insecta	Coleoptera	Histeridae	Bacanius	martensi	Gomy	1992
Insecta	Coleoptera	Hydrophilidae	Coelostoma	martensi	Hebauer	2002
Insecta	Coleoptera	Hydrophilidae	Hydraena	martensi	Skale and Jäch	2009
Insecta	Coleoptera	Latridiidae	Corticaria	martensi	Johnson	1977
Insecta	Coleoptera	Leiodidae	Agathidium	martensi	Angelini and De Marzo	1983
Insecta	Coleoptera	Leiodidae	Agathidium	martensianum	Angelini and De Marzo	1994
Insecta	Coleoptera	Leiodidae	Anisotoma	martensi	Angelini and De Marzo	1994
Insecta	Coleoptera	Lycidae	Punicealis	martensi	Kasantsev	1993
Insecta	Coleoptera	Melandriidae	Lederina	martensi	Nikitsky	1994
Insecta	Coleoptera	Nitidulidae	Epuraea	martensi	Kirejtshuk	1989
Insecta	Coleoptera	Ochodaeidae	Nothochodaeus	martensi	Huchet	2020
Insecta	Coleoptera	Oedemeridae	Nacerdes	martensi	Švihla	1973
Insecta	Coleoptera	Pyrochroidae	Ischalia	martensi	Paulus	1971
Insecta	Coleoptera	Scaphidiidae	Baeocera	martensi	Löbl	1992
Insecta	Coleoptera	Scarabaeidae	Microserica	martensi	Ahrens	1998
Insecta	Coleoptera	Scarabaeidae	Aphodius (Plagiogonus)	martensi	Stebnicka	1986
Insecta	Coleoptera	Scydmaenidae	Cephennodes	martensi	Jaloszyński	2017
Insecta	Coleoptera	Scydmaenidae	Cephennodes	paramartensi	Jaloszyński	2017
Insecta	Coleoptera	Scydmaenidae	Euconnus	martensianus	Franz	1971
Insecta	Coleoptera	Scydmaenidae	Euconnus	paramartensianus	Franz	1985
Insecta	Coleoptera	Scydmaenidae	Euconnus (Napochus)	martensis	Franz	1971
Insecta	Coleoptera	Scydmaenidae	Microscydmus	martensi	Franz	1971
Insecta	Coleoptera	Scydmaenidae	Scydmaenus	martensi	Franz	1971
Insecta	Coleoptera	Scydmaenidae	Scydmaenus	paramartensis	Franz	1971
Insecta	Coleoptera	Silphidae	Silpha	martensi	Emetz and Schawaller	1975
Insecta	Coleoptera	Staphylinidae	Amaurodera	martensi	Coiffait	1982
Insecta	Coleoptera	Staphylinidae	Atheta (Microdota)	martensiella	Pace	1987
Insecta	Coleoptera	Staphylinidae	Dianous	martensi	De Rougemont	1983
Insecta	Coleoptera	Staphylinidae	Edaphus	martensi	Puthz	1987
Insecta	Coleoptera	Staphylinidae	Emmelostiba	martensiana	Pace	1987
Insecta	Coleoptera	Staphylinidae	Encephalus (Ophnebioidea)	martensi	Pace	1987
Insecta	Coleoptera	Staphylinidae	Eusphalerum	martensi	Zanetti	2003
Insecta	Coleoptera	Staphylinidae	Gabrius	martensi	Schillhammer	1997
Insecta	Coleoptera	Staphylinidae	Leptusa (Drepanoleptusa)	martensi	Pace	1987
Insecta	Coleoptera	Staphylinidae	Liogluta	martensi	Pace	1987
Insecta	Coleoptera	Staphylinidae	Megarthrus	martensi	Coiffait	1982
Insecta	Coleoptera	Staphylinidae	Myrmecopora	martensi	Pace	1984
Insecta	Coleoptera	Staphylinidae	Nepalota	martensi	Pace	1987
Insecta	Coleoptera	Staphylinidae	Oncosomechusa	martensi	Pace	1987
Insecta	Coleoptera	Staphylinidae	Oxypoda	martensi	Pace	1984
Insecta	Coleoptera	Staphylinidae	Paederidus	martensi	Coiffait	1982
Insecta	Coleoptera	Staphylinidae	Pelioptera	martensi	Pace	1987
Insecta	Coleoptera	Staphylinidae	Pelioptera	martensianum	Pace	1987
Insecta	Coleoptera	Staphylinidae	Phacophallus	martensi	Bordoni	2002
Insecta	Coleoptera	Staphylinidae	Placusa	martensi	Pace	1987
Insecta	Coleoptera	Staphylinidae	Pseudoplandria	martensi	Pace	1987
Insecta	Coleoptera	Staphylinidae	Quedius (Microsaurus)	martensi	Smetana	1975
Insecta	Coleoptera	Staphylinidae	Someira	martensi	Bordoni	2002
Insecta	Coleoptera	Staphylinidae	Stenaesthetus	martensi	Puthz	1987
Insecta	Coleoptera	Staphylinidae	Stenus	martensi	Puthz	1983
Insecta	Coleoptera	Staphylinidae	Stenus	martensianus	Puthz	2013
Insecta	Coleoptera	Staphylinidae	Tachinus (Tachinoderus)	martensi	Coiffait	1982
Insecta	Coleoptera	Staphylinidae	Tachyporus	martensi	Coiffait	1982
Insecta	Coleoptera	Staphylinidae	Thoracostrongylus	martensi	Coiffait	1982
Insecta	Coleoptera	Staphylinidae	Thyreocephalus	jocheni	Bordoni	2002
Insecta	Coleoptera	Staphylinidae	Trichoglossina	martensi	Pace	1987
Insecta	Coleoptera	Staphylinidae	Tropimenelytron	martensianum	Pace	1987
Insecta	Coleoptera	Staphylinidae	Xantholinus	martensi	Bordoni	1983
Insecta	Coleoptera	Tenebrionidae	Blabs	martensi	Skopin	1978
Insecta	Coleoptera	Tenebrionidae	Freudeia	martensi	Kaszab	1977
Insecta	Coleoptera	Tenebrionidae	Gonocephalum	martensi	Kaszab	1977
Insecta	Coleoptera	Tenebrionidae	Laena	jocheni	Schawaller	2006
Insecta	Coleoptera	Tenebrionidae	Laena	martensi	Kaszab	1973
Insecta	Coleoptera	Tenebrionidae	Platydema	martensi	Schawaller	1994
Insecta	Coleoptera	Tenebrionidae	Strongylium	martensi	Masumoto and Schawaller	2010
Insecta	Coleoptera	Tenebrionidae	Xanthalia	martensi	Merkl	1991
Insecta	Dermaptera	Anisolabididae	Aborolabis	martensi	Brindle	1987
Insecta	Dermaptera	Forficulidae	Allodahlia	martensi	Brindle	1974
Insecta	Diptera	Dixidae	Dixa	martensi	Wagner	1983
Insecta	Ephemeroptera	Caenidae	Caenis	martensi	Malzacher	2018
Insecta	Ephemeroptera	Heptageniidae	Iron	martensi	Braasch	1981
Insecta	Heteroptera	Anthocoridae	Orius (Heterorius)	martensi	Péricart	1987
Insecta	Heteroptera	Aradidae	Bengalaria	martensi	Vásárhelyi	1986
Insecta	Heteroptera	Miridae	Lygus	martensi	Aglyamzyanov	2003
Insecta	Heteroptera	Nabidae	Phorticus	martensi	Kerzhner	1992
Insecta	Heteroptera	Schizopteridae	Kokeshia	martensi	Štys	1985
Insecta	Heteroptera	Tingidae	Thaicoris	martensi	Péricart	2000
Insecta	Heteroptera	Veliidae	Geovelia	martensi	Zimmermann	1984
Insecta	Hymenoptera	Apidae	Psithyrus (Eopsithyrus)	martensi	Tkalcu	1974
Insecta	Hymenoptera	Formicidae	Myrmica	martensi	Radchenko and Elmes	1998
Insecta	Odonata	Libellulidae	Orthetrum	martensi	Asahina	1978
Insecta	Orthoptera	Tetrigidae	Formosatettix	martensi	Ingrisch	2001
Insecta	Psocoptera	Caeciliidae	Caecilius	martensi	New	1983
Insecta	Psocoptera	Psocidae	Psococerastis	martensi	New	1987
Insecta	Siphonaptera	Leptopsyllidae	Ctenophyllus	martensi	Smit	1974
Mollusca	Gastropoda	Clausiliidae	Bathyptychia	martensi	Nordsieck	2001
Mollusca	Gastropoda	Clausiliidae	Montiphaedusa	martensiana	Nordsieck	1973
Mollusca	Gastropoda	Clausiliidae	Quadriplicata	lederi martensi	Nordsieck	1984
Myriapoda	Chilopoda	Lithobiidae	Lithobius (Ezembius)	martensi	Eason	1989
Myriapoda	Chilopoda	Scolopendridae	Otostigmus (Otostigmus)	martensi	Lewis	1992
Myriapoda	Diplopoda	Anthroleucosomatidae	Persedicus	martensi	Mauriès	1982
Myriapoda	Diplopoda	Blaniulidae	Nopoiulus (Paranopoiulus)	martensi	Enghoff	1984
Myriapoda	Diplopoda	Cayseidae	Martenseya	minutocaeca	Shear	2021
Myriapoda	Diplopoda	Cleidogonidae	Tianella	martensi	Shear	1979
Myriapoda	Diplopoda	Craspedosomatidae	Kelempekia	martensi	Strasser	1974
Myriapoda	Diplopoda	Glomeridellidae	Albanoglomus	martensi	Golovatch	1981
Myriapoda	Diplopoda	Julidae	Nepalmatoiulus	martensi	Enghoff	1987
Myriapoda	Diplopoda	Julidae	Ommatoiulus	martensi	Mauriès	1969
Myriapoda	Diplopoda	Opisotretidae	Martensodesmus	himalayensis	Golovatch	1987
Myriapoda	Diplopoda	Paradoxosomatidae	Beronodesmoides	martensi	Golovatch	2016
Myriapoda	Diplopoda	Paradoxosomatidae	Beronodesmus	martensi	Golovatch et al.	2016
Myriapoda	Diplopoda	Paradoxosomatidae	Gonobelus	martensi	Golovatch	2013
Myriapoda	Diplopoda	Paradoxosomatidae	Hedinomorpha	martensi	Golovatch	2014
Myriapoda	Diplopoda	Paradoxosomatidae	Hedinomorpha	martensorum	Golovatch	2021
Myriapoda	Diplopoda	Paradoxosomatidae	Martensosoma	(unicolor Attems 1936)	Golovatch	1992
Myriapoda	Diplopoda	Paradoxosomatidae	Paranedyopus	martensi	Golovatch	1990
Myriapoda	Diplopoda	Paradoxosomatidae	Tetracentrosternus	martensi	Golovatch	2016
Myriapoda	Diplopoda	Polydesmidae	Epanerchodus	martensi	Golovatch	2014
Myriapoda	Diplopoda	Polydesmidae	Nepalotretus	martensi	Golovatch	1987
Myriapoda	Diplopoda	Polydesmidae	Pacidesmus	martensi	Golovatch and Geoffroy	2006
Myriapoda	Diplopoda	Polydesmidae	Polydesmus	mediterraneus martensi	Strasser	1967
Myriapoda	Diplopoda	Trichopolydesmidae	Sholaphilus	martensi	Golovatch	1986
Myriapoda	Diplopoda	Xystodesnidae	Riukiaria	martensi	Golovatch	2014
Myriapoda	Diplopoda	Zephroniidae	Kophosphaera	martensi	Wesener	2015
Myriapoda	Pauropoda	Eurypauropodidae	Sphaeropauropus	martensi	Scheller	2000
Crustacea	Amphipoda	Gammaridae	Gammarus	martensi	H. Zhong-E. and L. Shuqiang	

=== Described taxa ===
List of animal genera, species, and subspecies described by Jochen Martens. The list comprises 297 taxa.

Taxa described by Jochen Martens
Class	Order	Family	Genus	Species / Subspecies	Author	Year
Arachnida	Acari	Galumnidae	Pergalumna	minituberculata	S.G. Ermilov and J. Martens	2014
Arachnida	Acari	Galumnidae	Carinogalumna	alineata	S.G. Ermilov and J. Martens	2014
Arachnida	Acari	Oribatidellidae	Oribatella	paraumaetluisorum	S.G. Ermilov and J. Martens	2014
Arachnida	Acari	Oppiidae	Taiwanoppia	nepalica	S.G. Ermilov and J. Martens	2014
Arachnida	Acari	Mochlozetidae	Uracrobates	truncatus	S.G. Ermilov and J. Martens	2015
Arachnida	Acari	Protoribatidae	Vilhenabates	schawalleri	S.G. Ermilov and J. Martens	2014
Arachnida	Acari	Oppiidae	Taiwanoppia	paranepalica	S.G. Ermilov and J. Martens	2014
Arachnida	Acari	Tegoribatidae	Lepidozetes	acutirostrum	S.G. Ermilov, J. Martens and A. Tolstikov	2013
Arachnida	Acari	Tegoribatidae	Scutozetes	clavatosensillus	S.G. Ermilov, J. Martens and A. Tolstikov	2013
Arachnida	Acari	Ceratozetidae	Ghilarovizetes	longiporosus	S.G. Ermilov and J. Martens	2014
Arachnida	Acari	Eremaeidae	Eremaeus	anichkini	S.G. Ermilov and J. Martens	2014
Arachnida	Acari	Scheloribatidae	Perscheloribates	nepalensis	S.G. Ermilov and J. Martens	2014
Arachnida	Acari	Oppiidae	Lasiobelba	daamsae	S.G. Ermilov, U. Shtanchaeva, L. Subias and J. Martens	2014
Arachnida	Acari	Oppiidae	Lasiobelba	nepalica	S.G. Ermilov, U. Shtanchaeva, L. Subias and J. Martens	2014
Arachnida	Acari	Parakalummidae	Neoribates	parabulanovae	S.G. Ermilov and J. Martens	2014
Arachnida	Acari	Parakalummidae	Neoribates	paramacrosacculatus	S.G. Ermilov, U. Shtanchaeva, L. Subias and J. Martens	2014
Arachnida	Acari	Parakalummidae	Neoribates	pararotundus	S.G. Ermilov and J. Martens	2014
Arachnida	Acari	Peloppiidae	Metapyroppia	gigantea	S.G. Ermilov and J. Martens	2014
Arachnida	Acari	Galumnidae	Galumna	tetraporosa	S.G. Ermilov, J. Martens and A. Tolstikov	2014
Arachnida	Araneae	Thomisidae	Xysticus	marusiki	H. Ono and J. Martens	2005
Arachnida	Araneae	Thomisidae	Xysticus	logunovi	H. Ono and J. Martens	2005
Arachnida	Araneae	Thomisidae	Xysticus	pieperi	H. Ono and J. Martens	2005
Arachnida	Araneae	Thomisidae	Oxyptila	makidica	H. Ono and J. Martens	2005
Arachnida	Araneae	Thomisidae	Oxyptila	lutosa	H. Ono and J. Martens	2005
Arachnida	Opiliones	unknown	Genus	enigmaticus	J. Martens	1969
Arachnida	Opiliones	Assamiidae	Metassamia	nepalica	J. Martens	1977
Arachnida	Opiliones	Phalangiidae	Amilenus	aurantiacus	J. Martens	1969
Arachnida	Opiliones	Trogulidae	Anelasmocephalus	balearicus	J. Martens and C. Chemini	1988
Arachnida	Opiliones	Trogulidae	Anelasmocephalus	brignolii	J. Martens and C. Chemini	1988
Arachnida	Opiliones	Trogulidae	Anelasmocephalus	calcaneatus	J. Martens and C. Chemini	1988
Arachnida	Opiliones	Trogulidae	Anelasmocephalus	hadzii	J. Martens	1978
Arachnida	Opiliones	Trogulidae	Anelasmocephalus	osellai	J. Martens and C. Chemini	1988
Arachnida	Opiliones	Trogulidae	Anelasmocephalus	pyrenaicus	J. Martens	1978
Arachnida	Opiliones	Trogulidae	Anelasmocephalus	tenuiglandis	J. Martens and C. Chemini	1988
Arachnida	Opiliones	Trogulidae	Anelasmocephalus	tuscus	J. Martens and C. Chemini	1988
Arachnida	Opiliones	Nemastomatidae	Asiolasma	billsheari	J. Martens	2019
Arachnida	Opiliones	Nemastomatidae	Asiolasma	juergengruberi	J. Martens	2019
Arachnida	Opiliones	Nemastomatidae	Asiolasma	schwendingeri	J. Martens	2019
Arachnida	Opiliones	Assamiidae	Assaphalla	peralata	J. Martens	1977
Arachnida	Opiliones	Phalangodidae	Ausobskya	athos	J. Martens	1972
Arachnida	Opiliones	Biantidae	Biantes	annapurnae	J. Martens	1978
Arachnida	Opiliones	Biantidae	Biantes	brevis	J. Martens	1978
Arachnida	Opiliones	Biantidae	Biantes	calyptroideus	X. Gong, J. Martens and C. Zhang	2020
Arachnida	Opiliones	Biantidae	Biantes	dilatatus	J. Martens	1978
Arachnida	Opiliones	Biantidae	Biantes	gandaki	J. Martens	1978
Arachnida	Opiliones	Biantidae	Biantes	gandakoides	J. Martens	1978
Arachnida	Opiliones	Biantidae	Biantes	ganesh	J. Martens	1978
Arachnida	Opiliones	Biantidae	Biantes	godavari	J. Martens	1978
Arachnida	Opiliones	Biantidae	Biantes	gurung	J. Martens	1978
Arachnida	Opiliones	Biantidae	Biantes	jirel	J. Martens	1978
Arachnida	Opiliones	Biantidae	Biantes	kathmandicus	J. Martens	1978
Arachnida	Opiliones	Biantidae	Biantes	magar	J. Martens	1978
Arachnida	Opiliones	Biantidae	Biantes	newar	J. Martens	1978
Arachnida	Opiliones	Biantidae	Biantes	pernepalicus	J. Martens	1978
Arachnida	Opiliones	Biantidae	Biantes	rarensis	J. Martens	1978
Arachnida	Opiliones	Biantidae	Biantes	sherpa	J. Martens	1978
Arachnida	Opiliones	Biantidae	Biantes	simplex	J. Martens	1978
Arachnida	Opiliones	Biantidae	Biantes	spatulatus	X. Gong, J. Martens and C. Zhang	2020
Arachnida	Opiliones	Biantidae	Biantes	thakkhali	J. Martens	1978
Arachnida	Opiliones	Biantidae	Biantes	thamang	J. Martens	1978
Arachnida	Opiliones	Sandokanidae	Biantoncopus	fuscus	J. Martens and P. Schwendinger	1998
Arachnida	Opiliones	Neogoveidae	Brasiliogovea	microphaga	J. Martens	1969
Arachnida	Opiliones	Sandokanidae	Caenoncopus	affinis	J. Martens and P. Schwendinger	1998
Arachnida	Opiliones	Sandokanidae	Caenoncopus	tenuis	J. Martens and P. Schwendinger	1998
Arachnida	Opiliones	Nemastomatidae	Caucnemastoma	golovatchi	J. Martens	2006
Arachnida	Opiliones	Nemastomatidae	Centetostoma	juberthiei	J. Martens	2011
Arachnida	Opiliones	Epedanidae	Dhaulagirius	altitudinalis	J. Martens	1977
Arachnida	Opiliones	Epedanidae	Euepedanus	dashdamirovi	C. Zhang and J. Martens	2020
Arachnida	Opiliones	Fissiphalliidae	Fissiphallius	spinulatus	J. Martens	1987
Arachnida	Opiliones	Fissiphalliidae	Fissiphallius	sturmi	J. Martens	1987
Arachnida	Opiliones	Fissiphalliidae	Fissiphallius	sympatricus	J. Martens	1987
Arachnida	Opiliones	Sclerosomatidae	Gagrella	annapurnica	J. Martens	1987
Arachnida	Opiliones	Sclerosomatidae	Gagrella	franzi	J. Martens	1987
Arachnida	Opiliones	Sclerosomatidae	Gagrella	tinjurae	J. Martens	1987
Arachnida	Opiliones	Nemastomatidae	Giljarovia	thoracocornuta	J. Martens	2006
Arachnida	Opiliones	Nemastomatidae	Giljarovia	triangula	J. Martens	2006
Arachnida	Opiliones	Nemastomatidae	Giljarovia	trianguloides	J. Martens	2006
Arachnida	Opiliones	Nemastomatidae	Giljarovia	vestita	J. Martens	2006
Arachnida	Opiliones	Sclerosomatidae	Globulosoma	gandakense	J. Martens	1987
Arachnida	Opiliones	Sclerosomatidae	Globulosoma	montivaga	J. Martens	1987
Arachnida	Opiliones	Sandokanidae	Gnomulus	annamiticus	P. Schwendinger and J. Martens	2006
Arachnida	Opiliones	Sandokanidae	Gnomulus	asli	J. Martens and P. Schwendinger	1998
Arachnida	Opiliones	Sandokanidae	Gnomulus	bedoharvengorum	P. Schwendinger and J. Martens	2006
Arachnida	Opiliones	Sandokanidae	Gnomulus	coniceps	J. Martens and P. Schwendinger	1998
Arachnida	Opiliones	Sandokanidae	Gnomulus	crucifer	J. Martens and P. Schwendinger	1998
Arachnida	Opiliones	Sandokanidae	Gnomulus	dalat	P. Schwendinger and J. Martens	2006
Arachnida	Opiliones	Sandokanidae	Gnomulus	hirsutus	J. Martens and P. Schwendinger	1998
Arachnida	Opiliones	Sandokanidae	Gnomulus	laruticus	J. Martens and P. Schwendinger	1998
Arachnida	Opiliones	Sandokanidae	Gnomulus	lemniscatus	P. Schwendinger and J. Martens	2006
Arachnida	Opiliones	Sandokanidae	Gnomulus	leyteensis	J. Martens and P. Schwendinger	1998
Arachnida	Opiliones	Sandokanidae	Gnomulus	maculatus	J. Martens and P. Schwendinger	1998
Arachnida	Opiliones	Sandokanidae	Gnomulus	saetosus	P. Schwendinger and J. Martens	2006
Arachnida	Opiliones	Phalangiidae	Graecophalangium	cretaeum	J. Martens	1966
Arachnida	Opiliones	Sclerosomatidae	Granulosoma	dissimile	J. Martens	2018
Arachnida	Opiliones	Sclerosomatidae	Granulosoma	umidulum	J. Martens	1973
Arachnida	Opiliones	Sclerosomatidae	Gyoides	gandaki	J. Martens	1982
Arachnida	Opiliones	Sclerosomatidae	Gyoides	geometricus	J. Martens	1982
Arachnida	Opiliones	Sclerosomatidae	Gyoides	himaldispersus	J. Martens	1982
Arachnida	Opiliones	Sclerosomatidae	Gyoides	maximus	J. Martens	1982
Arachnida	Opiliones	Sclerosomatidae	Gyoides	rivorum	J. Martens	1982
Arachnida	Opiliones	Sclerosomatidae	Gyoides	tibiouncinatus	J. Martens	1982
Arachnida	Opiliones	Sclerosomatidae	Harmanda	arunensis	J. Martens	1987
Arachnida	Opiliones	Sclerosomatidae	Harmanda	beroni	J. Martens	1987
Arachnida	Opiliones	Sclerosomatidae	Harmanda	corrugata	J. Martens	1987
Arachnida	Opiliones	Sclerosomatidae	Harmanda	instructa bhutanensis	J. Martens	1987
Arachnida	Opiliones	Sclerosomatidae	Harmanda	instructa lineatocoxa	J. Martens	1987
Arachnida	Opiliones	Sclerosomatidae	Harmanda	khumbua	J. Martens	1987
Arachnida	Opiliones	Sclerosomatidae	Harmanda	latephippiata	J. Martens	1987
Arachnida	Opiliones	Sclerosomatidae	Harmanda	medioimmicans	J. Martens	1987
Arachnida	Opiliones	Sclerosomatidae	Harmanda	nigrolineata	J. Martens	1987
Arachnida	Opiliones	Sclerosomatidae	Harmanda	periscopos	J. Martens	2018
Arachnida	Opiliones	Sclerosomatidae	Himaldroma	altus	J. Martens	1987
Arachnida	Opiliones	Sclerosomatidae	Himaldroma	pineti	J. Martens	1987
Arachnida	Opiliones	Phalangiidae	Himalphalangium	curvatum	J. Martens	2018
Arachnida	Opiliones	Phalangiidae	Himalphalangium	dolpoense	J. Martens	1973
Arachnida	Opiliones	Phalangiidae	Himalphalangium	suzukii	J. Martens	1973
Arachnida	Opiliones	Phalangiidae	Himalphalanglum	unistriatum	J. Martens	1973
Arachnida	Opiliones	Sclerosomatidae	Himalzaleptus	quinqueconicus	J. Martens	1987
Arachnida	Opiliones	Cladonychiidae	Holoscotolemon	lessiniense	J. Martens	1978
Arachnida	Opiliones	Cladonychiidae	Holoscotolemon	oreophilum	J. Martens	1978
Arachnida	Opiliones	Ischyropsalididae	Ischyropsalis	alpinula	J. Martens	1978
Arachnida	Opiliones	Ischyropsalididae	Ischyropsalis	lithoclasica	A. Schoenhofer and J. Martens	2010
Arachnida	Opiliones	Sclerosomatidae	Leiobunum	apenninicum	J. Martens	1969
Arachnida	Opiliones	Podoctidae	Leytpodoctis	oviger	J. Martens	1993
Arachnida	Opiliones	Nemastomatidae	Mediostoma	armatum	J. Martens	2006
Arachnida	Opiliones	Nemastomatidae	Mediostoma	nigrum	J. Martens	2006
Arachnida	Opiliones	Nemastomatidae	Mediostoma	variabile	J. Martens	2006
Arachnida	Opiliones	Neogoveidae	Metagovea	oviformis	J. Martens	1969
Arachnida	Opiliones	Sclerosomatidae	Metaverpulus	bhutanicus	J. Martens	1987
Arachnida	Opiliones	Sclerosomatidae	Metaverpulus	kanchensis	J. Martens	1987
Arachnida	Opiliones	Sclerosomatidae	Metaverpulus	multidentatus	J. Martens	2015
Arachnida	Opiliones	Sclerosomatidae	Metaverpulus	persimilis	J. Martens	1987
Arachnida	Opiliones	Assamiidae	Micrassamula	jumlensis	J. Martens	1977
Arachnida	Opiliones	Assamiidae	Micrassamula	thak	J. Martens	1977
Arachnida	Opiliones	Sclerosomatidae	Nelima	adelheidiana	J. Martens	1965
Arachnida	Opiliones	Sclerosomatidae	Nelima	hispana	J. Martens	1969
Arachnida	Opiliones	Sclerosomatidae	Nelima	ponticoides	J. Martens	1969
Arachnida	Opiliones	Sclerosomatidae	Nelima	recurvipenis	J. Martens	1969
Arachnida	Araneae	Agelenidae	Draconarius	bifarius	P.X. Wang and J. Martens	2009
Arachnida	Araneae	Agelenidae	Draconarius	brevicarenos	P.X. Wang and J. Martens	2009
Arachnida	Araneae	Agelenidae	Draconarius	condocephalus	P.X. Wang and J. Martens	2009
Arachnida	Araneae	Agelenidae	Draconarius	cylindratus	P.X. Wang and J. Martens	2009
Arachnida	Araneae	Agelenidae	Draconarius	subconfusus	P.X. Wang and J. Martens	2009
Arachnida	Araneae	Agelenidae	Draconarius	sacculus	P.X. Wang and J. Martens	2009
Arachnida	Araneae	Agelenidae	Draconarius	panchtharensis	P.X. Wang and J. Martens	2009
Arachnida	Araneae	Agelenidae	Draconarius	subrotundus	P.X. Wang and J. Martens	2009
Arachnida	Araneae	Agelenidae	Draconarius	taplejungensis	P.X. Wang and J. Martens	2009
Arachnida	Araneae	Agelenidae	Draconarius	testudinatus	P.X. Wang and J. Martens	2009
Arachnida	Araneae	Agelenidae	Draconarius	tinjuraensis	P.X. Wang and J. Martens	2009
Arachnida	Araneae	Agelenidae	Draconarius	latiforus	P.X. Wang and J. Martens	2009
Arachnida	Araneae	Agelenidae	Draconarius	tritos	P.X. Wang and J. Martens	2009
Arachnida	Araneae	Agelenidae	Draconarius	phulchokiensis	P.X. Wang and J. Martens	2009
Arachnida	Araneae	Agelenidae	Draconarius	pseudomeganiger	P.X. Wang and J. Martens	2009
Arachnida	Opiliones	Nemastomatidae	Nemaspela	femorecurvata	J. Martens	2006
Arachnida	Araneae	Agelenidae	Draconarius	confusus	P.X. Wang and J. Martens	2009
Arachnida	Araneae	Agelenidae	Draconarius	dorsicephalus	P.X. Wang and J. Martens	2009
Arachnida	Araneae	Agelenidae	Draconarius	semicirculus	P.X. Wang and J. Martens	2009
Arachnida	Araneae	Agelenidae	Draconarius	subepisomos	P.X. Wang and J. Martens	2009
Arachnida	Araneae	Agelenidae	Draconarius	pseudogurkha	P.X. Wang and J. Martens	2009
Arachnida	Araneae	Agelenidae	Draconarius	seorsus	P.X. Wang and J. Martens	2009
Arachnida	Araneae	Agelenidae	Draconarius	gorkhaensis	P.X. Wang and J. Martens	2009
Arachnida	Araneae	Agelenidae	Draconarius	schawalleri	P.X. Wang and J. Martens	2009
Arachnida	Opiliones	Nemastomatidae	Nemastoma	bidentatum relictum	J. Gruber and J. Martens	1968
Arachnida	Opiliones	Nemastomatidae	Nemastoma	bidentatum sparsum	J. Gruber and J. Martens	1968
Arachnida	Opiliones	Nemastomatidae	Nemastoma	schuelleri	J. Gruber and J. Martens	1968
Arachnida	Opiliones	Nemastomatidae	Nemastoma	transsylvanicum	J. Gruber and J. Martens	1968
Arachnida	Opiliones	Sclerosomatidae	Nepalgrella	kortaliensis	J. Martens	1987
Arachnida	Araneae	Agelenidae	Draconarius	spinosus	P.X. Wang and J. Martens	2009
Arachnida	Araneae	Agelenidae	Draconarius	beloniforis	P.X. Wang and J. Martens	2009
Arachnida	Araneae	Agelenidae	Draconarius	dapaensis	P.X. Wang and J. Martens	2009
Arachnida	Araneae	Agelenidae	Draconarius	simplicifolis	P.X. Wang and J. Martens	2009
Arachnida	Araneae	Agelenidae	Draconarius	meganiger	P.X. Wang and J. Martens	2009
Arachnida	Araneae	Agelenidae	Draconarius	microcoelotes	P.X. Wang and J. Martens	2009
Arachnida	Araneae	Agelenidae	Draconarius	contiguus	P.X. Wang and J. Martens	2009
Arachnida	Araneae	Agelenidae	Draconarius	capitellus	P.X. Wang and J. Martens	2009
Arachnida	Araneae	Agelenidae	Draconarius	communis	P.X. Wang and J. Martens	2009
Arachnida	Opiliones	Sclerosomatidae	Nepalgrella	yamputhini	J. Martens	1987
Arachnida	Araneae	Agelenidae	Draconarius	distinctus	P.X. Wang and J. Martens	2009
Arachnida	Araneae	Agelenidae	Draconarius	paraepisomos	P.X. Wang and J. Martens	2009
Arachnida	Araneae	Agelenidae	Draconarius	volutobursarius	P.X. Wang and J. Martens	2009
Arachnida	Opiliones	Sclerosomatidae	Nepalkanchia	pluviosilvestris	J. Martens	1987
Arachnida	Opiliones	Sclerosomatidae	Nepalkanchia	silvicola	J. Martens	1987
Arachnida	Opiliones	Assamiidae	Nepalsia	betula	J. Martens	1977
Arachnida	Opiliones	Assamiidae	Nepalsia	picea	J. Martens	1973
Arachnida	Opiliones	Assamiidae	Nepalsia	rhododendron	J. Martens	1977
Arachnida	Opiliones	Assamiidae	Nepalsioides	angusta	J. Martens	1977
Arachnida	Opiliones	Assamiidae	Nepalsioides	thodunga	J. Martens	1973
Arachnida	Opiliones	Nipponopsalididae	Nipponopsalis	abei	J. Martens and S. Suzuki	1966
Arachnida	Opiliones	Sandokanidae	Oncopus	expatriatus	P. Schwendinger and J. Martens	2004
Arachnida	Opiliones	Sandokanidae	Oncopus	malayanus	P. Schwendinger and J. Martens	2004
Arachnida	Opiliones	Sandokanidae	Oncopus	tiomanensis	P. Schwendinger and J. Martens	2004
Arachnida	Opiliones	Phalangiidae	Opilio	himalincola	J. Martens	1973
Arachnida	Opiliones	Sandokanidae	Palaeoncopus	gunung	J. Martens and P. Schwendinger	1998
Arachnida	Opiliones	Sandokanidae	Palaeoncopus	katik	J. Martens and P. Schwendinger	1998
Arachnida	Opiliones	Sandokanidae	Palaeoncopus	kerdil	J. Martens and P. Schwendinger	1998
Arachnida	Opiliones	Nemastomatidae	Paranemastoma	iranicum	J. Martens	2006
Arachnida	Opiliones	Assamiidae	Pashokia	maxima	J. Martens	1977
Arachnida	Opiliones	Assamiidae	Pashokia	mutatrix	J. Martens	1977
Arachnida	Opiliones	Assamiidae	Pashokia	silhavyi	J. Martens	1977
Arachnida	Opiliones	Sandokanidae	Pelitnus	hyatti	J. Martens	1977
Arachnida	Opiliones	Phalangiidae	Platybunus	alpinorelictus	J. Martens	1978
Arachnida	Opiliones	Epedanidae	Plistobunus	jaegeri	C. Zhang and J. Martens	2020
Arachnida	Opiliones	Sclerosomatidae	Pokhara	kathmandica	J. Martens	1978
Arachnida	Opiliones	Sclerosomatidae	Pokhara	minuta	J. Martens	1977
Arachnida	Opiliones	Sclerosomatidae	Pokhara	occidentalis	J. Martens	1987
Arachnida	Opiliones	Sclerosomatidae	Pokhara	quadriconica	J. Martens	1987
Arachnida	Opiliones	Sclerosomatidae	Pokhara	trisulensis	J. Martens	1987
Arachnida	Opiliones	Sclerosomatidae	Pokhara	uenoi	J. Martens	1987
Arachnida	Opiliones	Assamiidae	Propygoplus	siwalik	J. Martens	1977
Arachnida	Opiliones	Sclerosomatidae	Pseudastrobunus	perpusillus	J. Martens	1973
Arachnida	Opiliones	Sclerosomatidae	Rongsharia	dhaulagirica	J. Martens	1982
Arachnida	Opiliones	Sclerosomatidae	Rongsharia	dispersa	J. Martens	1982
Arachnida	Opiliones	Sabaconidae	Sabacon	aigoual	J. Martens	2015
Arachnida	Opiliones	Sabaconidae	Sabacon	altomontanus	J. Martens	1983
Arachnida	Opiliones	Sabaconidae	Sabacon	beatae	J. Martens	2015
Arachnida	Opiliones	Sabaconidae	Sabacon	beishanensis	J. Martens	2015
Arachnida	Opiliones	Sabaconidae	Sabacon	chomolongmae	J. Martens	1972
Arachnida	Opiliones	Sabaconidae	Sabacon	dhaulagiri	J. Martens	1972
Arachnida	Opiliones	Sabaconidae	Sabacon	jaegeri	J. Martens	2015
Arachnida	Opiliones	Sabaconidae	Sabacon	jiriensis	J. Martens	1972
Arachnida	Opiliones	Sabaconidae	Sabacon	kangding	J. Martens	2015
Arachnida	Opiliones	Sabaconidae	Sabacon	maipokhari	J. Martens	2015
Arachnida	Opiliones	Sabaconidae	Sabacon	minshanensis	J. Martens	2015
Arachnida	Opiliones	Sabaconidae	Sabacon	minutissimus	J. Martens	2015
Arachnida	Opiliones	Sabaconidae	Sabacon	monacanthus	L. Zhao, J. Martens and C. Zhang	2018
Arachnida	Opiliones	Sabaconidae	Sabacon	multiserratus	J. Martens	2015
Arachnida	Opiliones	Sabaconidae	Sabacon	nishikawai	J. Martens	2015
Arachnida	Opiliones	Sabaconidae	Sabacon	palpogranulatus	J. Martens	1972
Arachnida	Opiliones	Sabaconidae	Sabacon	pauperoserratus	J. Martens	2015
Arachnida	Opiliones	Sabaconidae	Sabacon	petarberoni	J. Martens	2015
Arachnida	Opiliones	Sabaconidae	Sabacon	picosantrum	J. Martens	1983
Arachnida	Opiliones	Sabaconidae	Sabacon	relictoides	J. Martens	2015
Arachnida	Opiliones	Sabaconidae	Sabacon	relictus	J. Martens	1972
Arachnida	Opiliones	Sabaconidae	Sabacon	rossopacificus	J. Martens	2015
Arachnida	Opiliones	Sabaconidae	Sabacon	rupinala	J. Martens	2015
Arachnida	Opiliones	Sabaconidae	Sabacon	schawalleri	J. Martens	2015
Arachnida	Opiliones	Sabaconidae	Sabacon	sergeidedicatus	J. Martens	1989
Arachnida	Opiliones	Sabaconidae	Sabacon	simbuakhola	J. Martens	2015
Arachnida	Opiliones	Sabaconidae	Sabacon	sineglandula	J. Martens	2015
Arachnida	Opiliones	Sabaconidae	Sabacon	suzukii	L. Zhao, J. Martens and C. Zhang	2018
Arachnida	Opiliones	Sabaconidae	Sabacon	thakkolanus	J. Martens	2015
Arachnida	Opiliones	Sabaconidae	Sabacon	unicornis	J. Martens	1972
Arachnida	Opiliones	Sabaconidae	Sabacon	viscayanus ramblaianus	J. Martens	1983
Arachnida	Opiliones	Nemastomatidae	Saccarella	schilleri	A. Schoenhofer and J. Martens	2012
Arachnida	Opiliones	Sclerosomatidae	Sericicorpus	nigrum	J. Martens	1987
Arachnida	Opiliones	Nemastomatidae	Sinostoma	yunnanicum	J. Martens	2016
Arachnida	Opiliones	Nemastomatidae	Starengovia	ivanloebli	J. Martens	2017
Arachnida	Opiliones	Nemastomatidae	Starengovia	quadrituberculata	C. Zhang and J. Martens	2018
Arachnida	Opiliones	Suthepiidae	Suthepia	inermis	J. Martens	2020
Arachnida	Opiliones	Epedanidae	Toccolus	kuryi	C. Zhang and J. Martens	2020
Arachnida	Opiliones	Trogulidae	Trogulus	balearicus	A. Schoenhofer and J. Martens	2008
Arachnida	Opiliones	Trogulidae	Trogulus	cisalpinus	C. Chemini and J. Martens	1988
Arachnida	Opiliones	Trogulidae	Trogulus	huberi	A. Schoenhofer and J. Martens	2008
Arachnida	Opiliones	Trogulidae	Trogulus	karamanorum	A. Schoenhofer and J. Martens	2009
Arachnida	Opiliones	Trogulidae	Trogulus	megaligrava	A. Schoenhofer, I. Karaman and J. Martens	2013
Arachnida	Opiliones	Trogulidae	Trogulus	melitensis	A. Schoenhofer and J. Martens	2009
Arachnida	Opiliones	Trogulidae	Trogulus	ozimeci	A. Schoenhofer, I. Karaman and J. Martens	2013
Arachnida	Opiliones	Trogulidae	Trogulus	pharensis	A. Schoenhofer and J. Martens	2009
Arachnida	Opiliones	Trogulidae	Trogulus	prietoi	A. Schoenhofer and J. Martens	2008
Arachnida	Opiliones	Trogulidae	Trogulus	pyrenaicus	A. Schoenhofer and J. Martens	2008
Arachnida	Opiliones	Trogulidae	Trogulus	tenuitarsus	A. Schoenhofer, I. Karaman and J. Martens	2013
Arachnida	Opiliones	Trogulidae	Trogulus	thaleri	A. Schoenhofer and J. Martens	2009
Arachnida	Opiliones	Nemastomatidae	Vestiferum	alatum	J. Martens	2006
Arachnida	Opiliones	Sclerosomatidae	Xerogrella	dolpensis	J. Martens	1987
Arachnida	Opiliones	Sclerosomatidae	Zaleptiolus	ater	J. Martens	1987
Arachnida	Opiliones	Phalangiidae	Megabunus	vignai	J. Martens	1978
Arachnida	Opiliones	Phalangiidae	Metaplatybunus	petrophilus	J. Martens	1965
Arachnida	Opiliones	Sandokanidae	Gnomulus	carinatus	P. Schwendinger and J. Martens	2002
Arachnida	Opiliones	Sandokanidae	Gnomulus	claviger	P. Schwendinger and J. Martens	2002
Arachnida	Opiliones	Sandokanidae	Gnomulus	crassipes	P. Schwendinger and J. Martens	2002
Arachnida	Opiliones	Sandokanidae	Gnomulus	exsudans	P. Schwendinger and J. Martens	2002
Arachnida	Opiliones	Sandokanidae	Gnomulus	hamatus	P. Schwendinger and J. Martens	2002
Arachnida	Opiliones	Sandokanidae	Gnomulus	hutan	P. Schwendinger and J. Martens	2002
Arachnida	Opiliones	Sandokanidae	Gnomulus	javanicus	P. Schwendinger and J. Martens	2002
Arachnida	Opiliones	Sandokanidae	Gnomulus	latoperculum	P. Schwendinger and J. Martens	2002
Arachnida	Opiliones	Sandokanidae	Gnomulus	leofeae	P. Schwendinger and J. Martens	2002
Arachnida	Opiliones	Sandokanidae	Gnomulus	lomani	P. Schwendinger and J. Martens	2002
Arachnida	Opiliones	Sandokanidae	Gnomulus	marginatus	P. Schwendinger and J. Martens	2002
Arachnida	Opiliones	Sandokanidae	Gnomulus	matabesar	P. Schwendinger and J. Martens	2002
Arachnida	Opiliones	Sandokanidae	Gnomulus	monticola	P. Schwendinger and J. Martens	2002
Arachnida	Opiliones	Sandokanidae	Gnomulus	obscurus	P. Schwendinger and J. Martens	2002
Arachnida	Opiliones	Sandokanidae	Gnomulus	pilosus	P. Schwendinger and J. Martens	2002
Arachnida	Opiliones	Sandokanidae	Gnomulus	rostratoideus	P. Schwendinger and J. Martens	2002
Arachnida	Opiliones	Sandokanidae	Gnomulus	ryssie	P. Schwendinger and J. Martens	2002
Arachnida	Opiliones	Sandokanidae	Gnomulus	sinensis	P. Schwendinger and J. Martens	2002
Arachnida	Opiliones	Sandokanidae	Gnomulus	spiniceps	P. Schwendinger and J. Martens	2002
Arachnida	Opiliones	Sandokanidae	Gnomulus	tuberculatus	P. Schwendinger and J. Martens	2002
Arachnida	Opiliones	Sandokanidae	Gnomulus	tumidifrons	P. Schwendinger and J. Martens	2002
Aves	Passeriformes	Pnoepygidae	Pnoepyga	immaculata	J. Martens and S. Eck	1991
Aves	Passeriformes	Phylloscopidae	Seicercus	omeiensis	J. Martens, S. Eck, M. Päckert and Y.-H. Sun	1999
Aves	Passeriformes	Regulidae	Regulus	regulus ellenthalerae	M. Päckert, C. Dietzen, J. Martens, M. Wink and L. Kvist	2006
Aves	Passeriformes	Paridae	Periparus	ater eckodedicatus	J. Martens, T. Tietze and Y.-H. Sun	2006
Aves	Passeriformes	Phylloscopidae	Phylloscopus	occisinensis	J. Martens, Y.-H. Sun and M. Päckert	2008
Aves	Passeriformes	Phylloscopidae	Phylloscopus	affinis perflavus	J. Martens, Y.-H. Sun and M. Päckert	2008
Aves	Passeriformes	Emberizidae	Emberiza	cia flemingorum	J. Martens	1972
Arachnida	Opiliones	Phalangiidae	Kalliste	pavonum	J. Martens	2018
Arachnida	Opiliones	Sclerosomatidae	Thunbergiae	gretae	J. Martens	2020
