= Oxyserica schawalleri =

Scientific classification
- Kingdom: Animalia
- Phylum: Arthropoda
- Class: Insecta
- Order: Coleoptera
- Suborder: Polyphaga
- Infraorder: Scarabaeiformia
- Family: Scarabaeidae
- Genus: Oxyserica
- Species: O. schawalleri

Binomial name
- Oxyserica schawalleri (Ahrens, 1998)

Synonyms
- Microserica schawalleri Ahrens, 1998

Species of beetle

Oxyserica schawalleri is a species of beetle of the family Scarabaeidae. It is found in western-central Nepal.

== Description ==
Adults reach a length of about 5.9-7.1 mm. They have a black, short, oval body. The elytra and sides of the pronotum are lighter brown. The dorsal surface is glabrous, except for the cilia along the margins.

== Etymology ==
The species is named for a colleague of the author, Dr. Wolfgang.
