= Placusini =

- Euvira micmac

Scientific classification
- Kingdom: Animalia
- Phylum: Arthropoda
- Clade: Pancrustacea
- Class: Insecta
- Order: Coleoptera
- Suborder: Polyphaga
- Infraorder: Staphyliniformia
- Family: Staphylinidae
- Subfamily: Aleocharinae
- Tribe: Placusini; Mulsant & Rey, 1871

Tribe of beetles

Placusini is a tribe of rove beetles in the subfamily Aleocharinae. It was first described by Mulsant and Rey in 1871. It contains 6 genera with 190 accepted species.

== Genera ==
- Euryachen
- Euvira
- Kyrtusa
- Placukoma
- Placusa
- Speiraphallusa
