= Oxyserica darjeelingia =

Scientific classification
- Kingdom: Animalia
- Phylum: Arthropoda
- Class: Insecta
- Order: Coleoptera
- Suborder: Polyphaga
- Infraorder: Scarabaeiformia
- Family: Scarabaeidae
- Genus: Oxyserica
- Species: O. darjeelingia

Binomial name
- Oxyserica darjeelingia (Brenske, 1898)

Synonyms
- Microserica darjeelingia Brenske, 1898

Species of beetle

Oxyserica darjeelingia is a species of beetle of the family Scarabaeidae. It is found in India (Darjeeling, Sikkim).

== Description ==
Adults reach a length of about 4 mm. They have a broadly egg-shaped, slightly dull, strongly opalescent body. They are dark underneath, with a silky sheen. The pronotum shimmers green, and the elytra are yellowish with a dark margin and a broad band in the middle, which extends from the outer margin to the suture, but usually ends before it. The suture is only narrow and weakly darkened. Less frequently, the entire animal is uniformly yellowish-brown, in which case the head and pronotum as well as the band on the elytra are a shade darker. The legs are always glossy brown.
