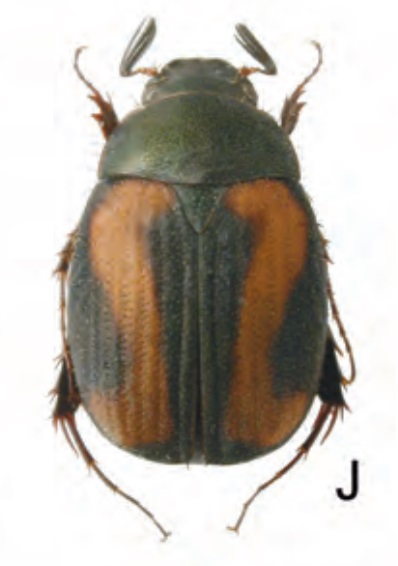

Scientific classification
- Kingdom: Animalia
- Phylum: Arthropoda
- Class: Insecta
- Order: Coleoptera
- Suborder: Polyphaga
- Infraorder: Scarabaeiformia
- Family: Scarabaeidae
- Genus: Oxyserica
- Species: O. bhutanensis

Binomial name
- Oxyserica bhutanensis (Frey, 1975)

Synonyms
- Microserica bhutanensis Frey, 1975

= Oxyserica bhutanensis =

Species of beetle

Oxyserica bhutanensis is a species of beetle of the family Scarabaeidae. It is found in India (Meghalaya) and Bhutan.

== Description ==
Adults reach a length of about 5.5-6.2 mm. They have a light reddish-brown to dark brown, oblong-oval body. The head, scutellum and front of the pronotum are coppery green.
