= Trichotichnus nipponicus =

Scientific classification
- Kingdom: Animalia
- Phylum: Arthropoda
- Class: Insecta
- Order: Coleoptera
- Suborder: Adephaga
- Family: Carabidae
- Subfamily: Harpalinae
- Tribe: Harpalini
- Subtribe: Harpalina
- Genus: Trichotichnus
- Species: T. nipponicus

Binomial name
- Trichotichnus nipponicus Habu, 1961

Synonyms
- Harpalus fukiensis

Species of beetle

Trichotichnus nipponicus is a species in the beetle family Carabidae. It is found in China, Japan, and Taiwan.
