= Oxyserica hispidula =

Scientific classification
- Kingdom: Animalia
- Phylum: Arthropoda
- Class: Insecta
- Order: Coleoptera
- Suborder: Polyphaga
- Infraorder: Scarabaeiformia
- Family: Scarabaeidae
- Genus: Oxyserica
- Species: O. hispidula

Binomial name
- Oxyserica hispidula (Frey, 1975)

Synonyms
- Microserica hispidula Frey, 1975

Species of beetle

Oxyserica hispidula is a species of beetle of the family Scarabaeidae. It is found in Bhutan.
