= Oxyserica bimaculata =

Scientific classification
- Kingdom: Animalia
- Phylum: Arthropoda
- Class: Insecta
- Order: Coleoptera
- Suborder: Polyphaga
- Infraorder: Scarabaeiformia
- Family: Scarabaeidae
- Genus: Oxyserica
- Species: O. bimaculata

Binomial name
- Oxyserica bimaculata (Hope, 1831)

Synonyms
- Serica bimaculata Hope, 1831; Autoserica bimaculata; Microserica janetscheki Frey, 1969

Species of beetle

Oxyserica bimaculata is a species of beetle of the family Scarabaeidae. It is found in central Nepal.
