= Oxyserica bifascipennis =

Scientific classification
- Kingdom: Animalia
- Phylum: Arthropoda
- Class: Insecta
- Order: Coleoptera
- Suborder: Polyphaga
- Infraorder: Scarabaeiformia
- Family: Scarabaeidae
- Genus: Oxyserica
- Species: O. bifascipennis

Binomial name
- Oxyserica bifascipennis Ahrens, Lukic & Liu, 2023

Species of beetle

Oxyserica bifascipennis is a species of beetle of the family Scarabaeidae. It is found in Myanmar.

== Description ==
Adults reach a length of about 7–7.2 mm. They have a dark reddish brown, oblong-oval body. The elytra and part of the antennae are yellowish brown, while the elytral margins and one transversal mesolateral spot are dark brown. The dorsal surface is dull or partly with iridescent shine, and nearly glabrous.

== Etymology ==
The name of the species is derived from the combined Latin prefix bi (meaning two), and the words fascis (meaning stripes) and pennis (meaning wing).
