= Oxyserica serena =

Scientific classification
- Kingdom: Animalia
- Phylum: Arthropoda
- Class: Insecta
- Order: Coleoptera
- Suborder: Polyphaga
- Infraorder: Scarabaeiformia
- Family: Scarabaeidae
- Genus: Oxyserica
- Species: O. serena

Binomial name
- Oxyserica serena Ahrens, Lukic & Liu, 2023

Species of beetle

Oxyserica serena is a species of beetle of the family Scarabaeidae. It is found in Myanmar.

== Description ==
Adults reach a length of about 4.7 mm. They have a light reddish brown, short-oval body. The elytra and part of the antennae are yellowish brown, while the head, antennal club, elytral margins and one transversal mesolateral spot are dark brown. The dorsal surface is dull and nearly glabrous.

== Etymology ==
The name of the species is derived from Latin serenus (meaning light).
