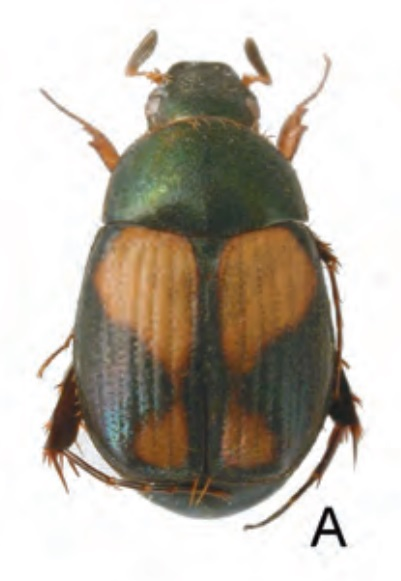

Scientific classification
- Kingdom: Animalia
- Phylum: Arthropoda
- Class: Insecta
- Order: Coleoptera
- Suborder: Polyphaga
- Infraorder: Scarabaeiformia
- Family: Scarabaeidae
- Genus: Oxyserica
- Species: O. brancuccii

Binomial name
- Oxyserica brancuccii (Ahrens, 2001)

Synonyms
- Microserica brancuccii Ahrens, 2001

= Oxyserica brancuccii =

Species of beetle

Oxyserica brancuccii is a species of beetle of the family Scarabaeidae. It is found in central Nepal and India (Darjeeling, Sikkim).
