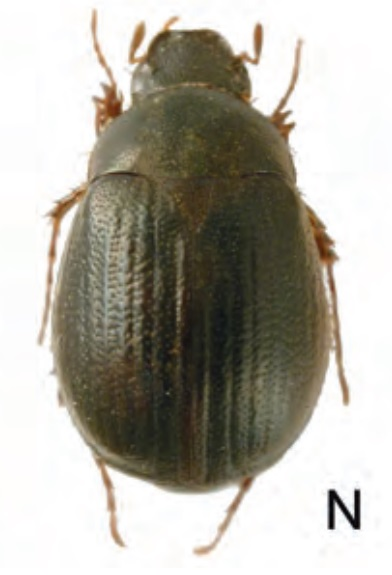

Scientific classification
- Kingdom: Animalia
- Phylum: Arthropoda
- Class: Insecta
- Order: Coleoptera
- Suborder: Polyphaga
- Infraorder: Scarabaeiformia
- Family: Scarabaeidae
- Genus: Oxyserica
- Species: O. pruinosa

Binomial name
- Oxyserica pruinosa (Hope, 1831)

Synonyms
- Serica pruinosa Hope, 1831; Microserica pruinosa; Omaloplia subaenea Blanchard, 1850

= Oxyserica pruinosa =

Species of beetle

Oxyserica pruinosa is a species of beetle of the family Scarabaeidae. It is found in the Himalaya, from east of the Sutlej river to eastern Nepal.

== Description ==
Adults reach a length of about 5.8-6.6 mm. They have a black, short, oval body. The elytra are sometimes translucent reddish brown.
