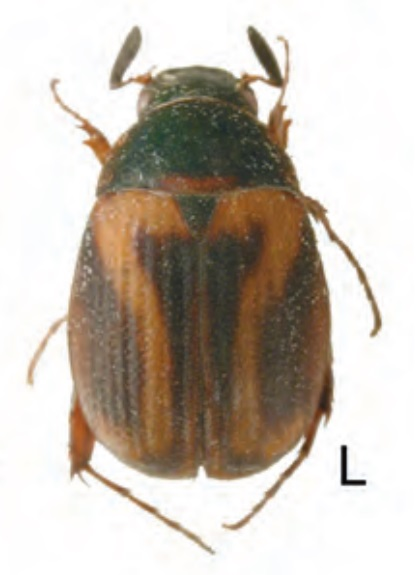

Scientific classification
- Kingdom: Animalia
- Phylum: Arthropoda
- Class: Insecta
- Order: Coleoptera
- Suborder: Polyphaga
- Infraorder: Scarabaeiformia
- Family: Scarabaeidae
- Genus: Oxyserica
- Species: O. interrogator

Binomial name
- Oxyserica interrogator (Arrow, 1946)

Synonyms
- Aserica interrogator Arrow, 1946; Microserica interrogator; Oxyserica interrogata

= Oxyserica interrogator =

Species of beetle

Oxyserica interrogator is a species of beetle of the family Scarabaeidae. It is found from the Kumaon-Himalaya to eastern-central Nepal.

== Description ==
Adults reach a length of about 5.3-6.1 mm. They have a black to brown, oval body. The margins of the pronotum and the elytra are yellowish-brown.
