= Oxyserica hellmichi =

Scientific classification
- Kingdom: Animalia
- Phylum: Arthropoda
- Class: Insecta
- Order: Coleoptera
- Suborder: Polyphaga
- Infraorder: Scarabaeiformia
- Family: Scarabaeidae
- Genus: Oxyserica
- Species: O. hellmichi

Binomial name
- Oxyserica hellmichi (Frey, 1965)

Synonyms
- Microserica hellmichi Frey, 1965

Species of beetle

Oxyserica hellmichi is a species of beetle of the family Scarabaeidae. It is found in the eastern-central part of the Himalayas.
