= Oxyserica gandakiensis =

Scientific classification
- Kingdom: Animalia
- Phylum: Arthropoda
- Class: Insecta
- Order: Coleoptera
- Suborder: Polyphaga
- Infraorder: Scarabaeiformia
- Family: Scarabaeidae
- Genus: Oxyserica
- Species: O. gandakiensis

Binomial name
- Oxyserica gandakiensis (Ahrens, 1998)

Synonyms
- Microserica gandakiensis Ahrens, 1998

Species of beetle

Oxyserica gandakiensis is a species of beetle of the family Scarabaeidae. It is found in western-central Nepal.

== Description ==
Adults reach a length of about 4.6-5.6 mm. They have a black, elongate-oval body. The elytra are reddish brown with black margins.
