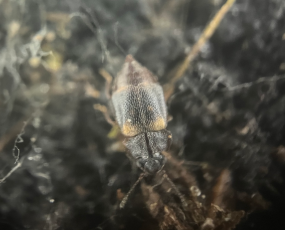

Scientific classification
- Kingdom: Animalia
- Phylum: Arthropoda
- Class: Insecta
- Order: Coleoptera
- Suborder: Polyphaga
- Infraorder: Staphyliniformia
- Family: Staphylinidae
- Genus: Megarthrus
- Species: M. pictus

Binomial name
- Megarthrus pictus Motschulsky, 1845

= Megarthrus pictus =

Species of rove beetle

Megarthrus pictus is a rove beetle in the genus Megarthrus found in western North America.

This species is the only nearctic species with bicolored elytra and angulate temples that is endemic to Western North America. The body is also mostly brownish yellow overall.
