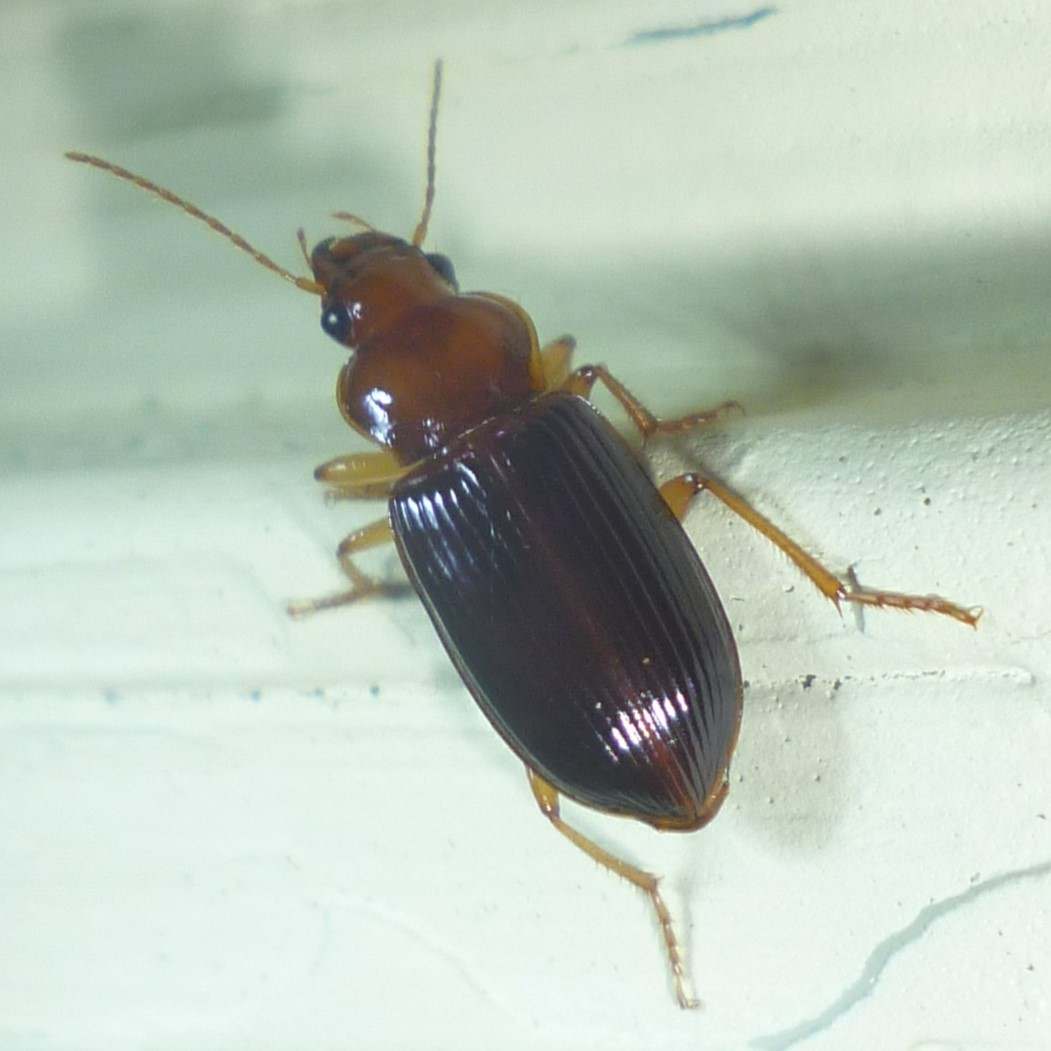

Scientific classification
- Kingdom: Animalia
- Phylum: Arthropoda
- Class: Insecta
- Order: Coleoptera
- Suborder: Adephaga
- Family: Carabidae
- Subfamily: Harpalinae
- Tribe: Harpalini
- Genus: Trichotichnus
- Species: T. vulpeculus

Binomial name
- Trichotichnus vulpeculus (Say, 1823)

= Trichotichnus vulpeculus =

Species of beetle

Trichotichnus vulpeculus is a species of ground beetle in the family Carabidae. It is found in North America.
