= Trichotichnus koshiensis =

Scientific classification
- Domain: Eukaryota
- Kingdom: Animalia
- Phylum: Arthropoda
- Class: Insecta
- Order: Coleoptera
- Suborder: Adephaga
- Family: Carabidae
- Subfamily: Harpalinae
- Tribe: Harpalini
- Subtribe: Harpalina
- Genus: Trichotichnus
- Species: T. koshiensis

Binomial name
- Trichotichnus koshiensis (Kirschenhofer, 1992)

Synonyms
- Harpalus koshiensis Kirschenhofer, 1992

Species of beetle

Trichotichnus koshiensis is a species in the beetle family Carabidae. It is found in Nepal.
