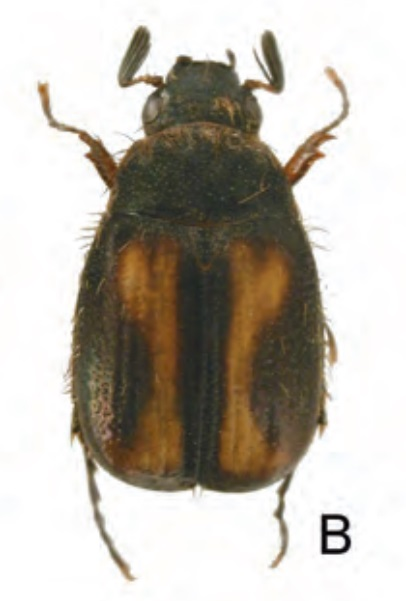
- Oxyserica pygidialis annapurnae

Scientific classification
- Kingdom: Animalia
- Phylum: Arthropoda
- Class: Insecta
- Order: Coleoptera
- Suborder: Polyphaga
- Infraorder: Scarabaeiformia
- Family: Scarabaeidae
- Genus: Oxyserica
- Species: O. pygidialis

Binomial name
- Oxyserica pygidialis Brenske, 1900

Synonyms
- Microserica (Parvulomaladera) annapurnae Ahrens, 1995; Autoserica bimaculata Khan & Ghai, 1980; Microserica simlana Brenske, 1902

= Oxyserica pygidialis =

Species of beetle

Oxyserica pygidialis is a species of beetle of the family Scarabaeidae. It is found in Nepal, Pakistan, India (Uttar Pradesh, Uttarakhand) and China (Xizang).

== Description ==
Adults reach a length of about 4 mm. They have a short, egg-shaped body. They are dull and opalescent above, while the pygidium and underside are shiny. They are dark in colour, with the head and pronotum greenish, the elytra pale yellow, and the suture, lateral margin and a central patch on the pygidium dark. The legs and antennae are brownish-red.

== Subspecies ==
- Oxyserica pygidialis pygidialis (Nepal, Pakistan, India: Uttar Pradesh and Uttarakhand)
- Oxyserica pygidialis annapurnae (Ahrens, 1995) (Nepal, China: Xizang)
