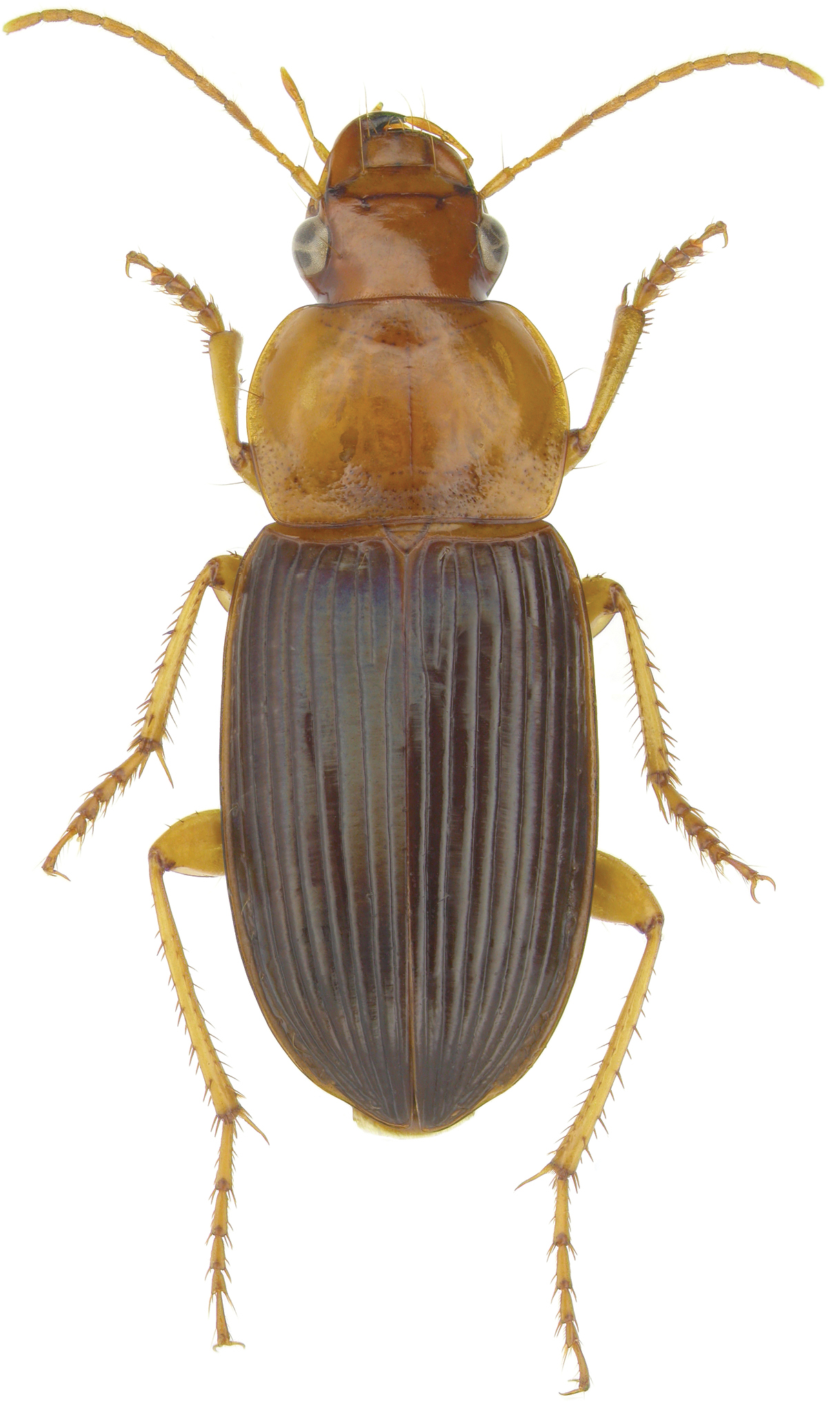

Scientific classification
- Kingdom: Animalia
- Phylum: Arthropoda
- Class: Insecta
- Order: Coleoptera
- Suborder: Adephaga
- Family: Carabidae
- Tribe: Harpalini
- Genus: Trichotichnus
- Species: T. dichrous

Binomial name
- Trichotichnus dichrous (Dejean, 1829)

= Trichotichnus dichrous =

Species of beetle

Trichotichnus dichrous is a species of ground beetle in the family Carabidae. It is found in North America.
