= Trichotichnus autumnalis =

Scientific classification
- Domain: Eukaryota
- Kingdom: Animalia
- Phylum: Arthropoda
- Class: Insecta
- Order: Coleoptera
- Suborder: Adephaga
- Family: Carabidae
- Subfamily: Harpalinae
- Tribe: Harpalini
- Genus: Trichotichnus
- Species: T. autumnalis

Binomial name
- Trichotichnus autumnalis (Say, 1823)

Synonyms
- Episcopellus autumnalis Say, 1823; Trichotichnus nitescens (Casey, 1914)

Species of beetle

Trichotichnus autumnalis is a species of ground beetle in the family Carabidae. It is found in North America.
