= Oxyserica elegans =

Scientific classification
- Kingdom: Animalia
- Phylum: Arthropoda
- Class: Insecta
- Order: Coleoptera
- Suborder: Polyphaga
- Infraorder: Scarabaeiformia
- Family: Scarabaeidae
- Genus: Oxyserica
- Species: O. elegans

Binomial name
- Oxyserica elegans (Frey, 1975)

Synonyms
- Autoserica elegans Frey, 1975; Microserica elegans

Species of beetle

Oxyserica elegans is a species of beetle of the family Scarabaeidae. It is found in Bhutan.

== Description ==
Adults reach a length of about 5.8 mm. They have an reddish brown, oval body. The elytra is weakly iridescent and the dorsal surface is dull and nearly glabrous.
