= Oxyserica longefoliata =

Scientific classification
- Kingdom: Animalia
- Phylum: Arthropoda
- Class: Insecta
- Order: Coleoptera
- Suborder: Polyphaga
- Infraorder: Scarabaeiformia
- Family: Scarabaeidae
- Genus: Oxyserica
- Species: O. longefoliata

Binomial name
- Oxyserica longefoliata (Frey, 1965)

Synonyms
- Microserica longefoliata Frey, 1965

Species of beetle

Oxyserica longefoliata is a species of beetle of the family Scarabaeidae. It is found in China (Xizang) and central Nepal.
