= Oxyserica nigropicta =

Scientific classification
- Kingdom: Animalia
- Phylum: Arthropoda
- Class: Insecta
- Order: Coleoptera
- Suborder: Polyphaga
- Infraorder: Scarabaeiformia
- Family: Scarabaeidae
- Genus: Oxyserica
- Species: O. nigropicta

Binomial name
- Oxyserica nigropicta (Fairmaire, 1891)

Synonyms
- Serica nigropicta Fairmaire, 1891; Microserica nigropicta

Species of beetle

Oxyserica nigropicta is a species of beetle of the family Scarabaeidae. It is found in China (Guizhou, Hubei, Yunnan).

== Description ==
Adults reach a length of about 5 mm. They have a black, oval body. The legs are brown and the elytra is reddish brown with the margins and one transversal mesolateral and one anteromedial spot black. The dorsal surface is dull and nearly glabrous.
