= Oxyserica =

Scientific classification
- Kingdom: Animalia
- Phylum: Arthropoda
- Class: Insecta
- Order: Coleoptera
- Suborder: Polyphaga
- Infraorder: Scarabaeiformia
- Family: Scarabaeidae
- Subfamily: Sericinae
- Tribe: Sericini
- Genus: Oxyserica; Brenske, 1899

Synonyms
- Microserica (Parvulomaladera) Ahrens, 1995; Parvulomaladera Ahrens, 1995

Genus of leaf beetles

Oxyserica is a genus of beetles belonging to the family Scarabaeidae.

== Species ==
- Oxyserica arunensis (Ahrens, 1998)
- Oxyserica bhutanensis (Frey, 1975)
- Oxyserica bifascipennis Ahrens, Lukic & Liu, 2023
- Oxyserica bimaculata (Hope, 1831)
- Oxyserica brancuccii (Ahrens, 2001)
- Oxyserica cechovskyi (Ahrens, 1999)
- Oxyserica darjeelingia (Brenske, 1899)
- Oxyserica diversicornis (Moser, 1915)
- Oxyserica elegans (Frey, 1975)
- Oxyserica gandakiensis (Ahrens, 1998)
- Oxyserica goertzae Sreedevi, Ranasinghe, Fabrizi & Ahrens, 2019
- Oxyserica hellmichi (Frey, 1965)
- Oxyserica hispidula (Frey, 1975)
- Oxyserica interrogator (Arrow, 1946)
- Oxyserica kanchenjungae (Ahrens, 1995)
- Oxyserica kurseongana (Moser, 1915)
- Oxyserica longefoliata (Frey, 1965)
- Oxyserica marginata (Brenske, 1896)
- Oxyserica martensi (Ahrens, 1998)
- Oxyserica myagdiana (Ahrens, 1998)
- Oxyserica nigropicta (Fairmaire, 1891)
- Oxyserica pedongensis (Ahrens, 1998)
- Oxyserica pruinosa (Hope, 1831)
- Oxyserica pygidialis Brenske, 1900
- Oxyserica schawalleri (Ahrens, 1998)
- Oxyserica schulzei (Ahrens, 1997)
- Oxyserica serena Ahrens, Lukic & Liu, 2023
- Oxyserica steelei (Ahrens, 2004)
- Oxyserica truncata (Brenske, 1899)
- Oxyserica varia (Frey, 1975)
