= Oxyserica arunensis =

Scientific classification
- Kingdom: Animalia
- Phylum: Arthropoda
- Class: Insecta
- Order: Coleoptera
- Suborder: Polyphaga
- Infraorder: Scarabaeiformia
- Family: Scarabaeidae
- Genus: Oxyserica
- Species: O. arunensis

Binomial name
- Oxyserica arunensis (Ahrens, 1998)

Synonyms
- Microserica arunensis Ahrens, 1998

Species of beetle

Oxyserica arunensis is a species of beetle of the family Scarabaeidae. It is found in eastern Nepal.

== Description ==
Adults reach a length of about 6-6.9 mm. They have a black, elongate-oval body. The elytra are lighter brown. The dorsal surface is glabrous, except for the cilia along the margins.
