= Oxyserica diversicornis =

Scientific classification
- Kingdom: Animalia
- Phylum: Arthropoda
- Clade: Pancrustacea
- Class: Insecta
- Order: Coleoptera
- Suborder: Polyphaga
- Infraorder: Scarabaeiformia
- Family: Scarabaeidae
- Genus: Oxyserica
- Species: O. diversicornis

Binomial name
- Oxyserica diversicornis (Moser, 1915)

Synonyms
- Microserica diversicornis Moser, 1915

Species of beetle

Oxyserica diversicornis is a species of beetle of the family Scarabaeidae. It is found in China (Guangdong, Hubei, Hunan, Jiangxi, Shaanxi, Yunnan).

== Description ==
Adults reach a length of about 5.2 mm. They have a black, oval body. The legs are brown and the elytra are reddish brown with the margins and one transversal mesolateral and one anteromedial spot black. The dorsal surface is dull and nearly glabrous.
