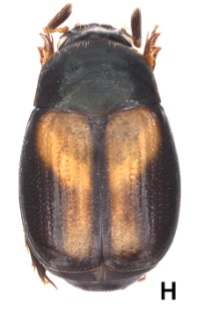

Scientific classification
- Kingdom: Animalia
- Phylum: Arthropoda
- Class: Insecta
- Order: Coleoptera
- Suborder: Polyphaga
- Infraorder: Scarabaeiformia
- Family: Scarabaeidae
- Genus: Oxyserica
- Species: O. goertzae

Binomial name
- Oxyserica goertzae Sreedevi, Ranasinghe, Fabrizi & Ahrens, 2019

= Oxyserica goertzae =

Species of beetle

Oxyserica goertzae is a species of beetle of the family Scarabaeidae. It is found in Nepal.

== Description ==
Adults reach a length of about 5.1 mm. They have a blackish, oval body. The legs are brown, the elytra yellowish brown with the margins and a transversal mesolateral spot black. The dorsal surface is dull and nearly glabrous.

== Etymology ==
The species is dedicated to Dagmar Görtz.
