= Oxyserica cechovskyi =

Scientific classification
- Kingdom: Animalia
- Phylum: Arthropoda
- Class: Insecta
- Order: Coleoptera
- Suborder: Polyphaga
- Infraorder: Scarabaeiformia
- Family: Scarabaeidae
- Genus: Oxyserica
- Species: O. cechovskyi

Binomial name
- Oxyserica cechovskyi (Ahrens, 1999)

Synonyms
- Microserica cechovskyi Ahrens, 1999

Species of beetle

Oxyserica cechovskyi is a species of beetle of the family Scarabaeidae. It is found in eastern Nepal.
