= Oxyserica schulzei =

Scientific classification
- Kingdom: Animalia
- Phylum: Arthropoda
- Class: Insecta
- Order: Coleoptera
- Suborder: Polyphaga
- Infraorder: Scarabaeiformia
- Family: Scarabaeidae
- Genus: Oxyserica
- Species: O. schulzei

Binomial name
- Oxyserica schulzei (Ahrens, 1997)

Synonyms
- Microserica schulzei Ahrens, 1997

Species of beetle

Oxyserica schulzei is a species of beetle of the family Scarabaeidae. It is found in western-central Nepal.

== Description ==
Adults reach a length of about 5–6 mm. They have a black to brown, oval body. The margins of the pronotum and the elytra are yellowish-brown.

== Etymology ==
The species is named after a colleague of the author, Joachim Schulze.
