= Oxyserica myagdiana =

Scientific classification
- Kingdom: Animalia
- Phylum: Arthropoda
- Class: Insecta
- Order: Coleoptera
- Suborder: Polyphaga
- Infraorder: Scarabaeiformia
- Family: Scarabaeidae
- Genus: Oxyserica
- Species: O. myagdiana

Binomial name
- Oxyserica myagdiana (Ahrens, 1998)

Synonyms
- Microserica myagdiana Ahrens, 1998

Species of beetle

Oxyserica myagdiana is a species of beetle of the family Scarabaeidae. It is found in western-central Nepal.

== Description ==
Adults reach a length of about 3.8–4 mm. They have a yellowish-brown, elongate-oval body. The underside is dark brown and the head, antennae and the disc of the pronotum are dark. The dorsal surface is glabrous, except for the cilia along the margins.
