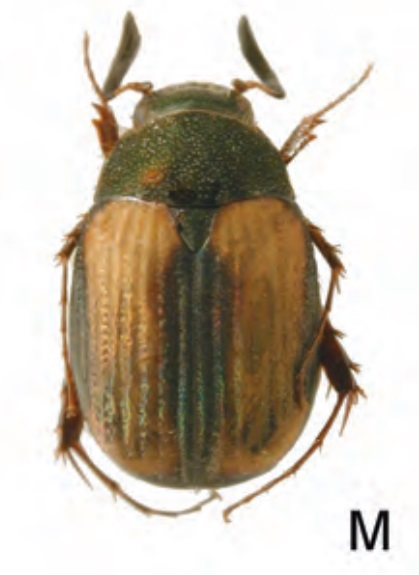

Scientific classification
- Kingdom: Animalia
- Phylum: Arthropoda
- Class: Insecta
- Order: Coleoptera
- Suborder: Polyphaga
- Infraorder: Scarabaeiformia
- Family: Scarabaeidae
- Genus: Oxyserica
- Species: O. marginata

Binomial name
- Oxyserica marginata (Brenske, 1896)

Synonyms
- Serica marginata Brenske, 1896; Microserica marginata; Aserica problematica Arrow, 1946; Autoserica unctiuscula Brenske, 1898

= Oxyserica marginata =

Species of beetle

Oxyserica marginata is a species of beetle of the family Scarabaeidae. It is found in eastern Nepal and India (the Darjeeling/Sikkim area).

== Description ==
Adults reach a length of about 5.6–6 mm. They have a black to light brown, oval body. The elytra are yellowish-brown with darker margins.
