= Oxyserica steelei =

Scientific classification
- Kingdom: Animalia
- Phylum: Arthropoda
- Class: Insecta
- Order: Coleoptera
- Suborder: Polyphaga
- Infraorder: Scarabaeiformia
- Family: Scarabaeidae
- Genus: Oxyserica
- Species: O. steelei

Binomial name
- Oxyserica steelei (Ahrens, 2004)

Synonyms
- Microserica steelei Ahrens, 2004

Species of beetle

Oxyserica steelei is a species of beetle of the family Scarabaeidae. It is found in south-eastern Tibet and in the Mishmi Hills.

== Description ==
Adults reach a length of about 5-5.7 mm. They have a black, elongate-oval body, with reddish-brown legs and yellowish-brown elytra. The dorsal surface is mostly dull and glabrous except for some setae on the head, elytra, and pronotum.

== Etymology ==
The species is named after its collector, M. Steele.
