= Trichotichnus philippinus =

Scientific classification
- Kingdom: Animalia
- Phylum: Arthropoda
- Class: Insecta
- Order: Coleoptera
- Suborder: Adephaga
- Family: Carabidae
- Tribe: Harpalini
- Genus: Trichotichnus
- Species: T. philippinus

Binomial name
- Trichotichnus philippinus (Jedlicka, 1935)

Genus of beetles

Trichotichnus philippinus is a species of beetle in the family Carabidae. It was formerly a member of the genus Bottchrus.
