= Oxyserica pedongensis =

Scientific classification
- Kingdom: Animalia
- Phylum: Arthropoda
- Class: Insecta
- Order: Coleoptera
- Suborder: Polyphaga
- Infraorder: Scarabaeiformia
- Family: Scarabaeidae
- Genus: Oxyserica
- Species: O. pedongensis

Binomial name
- Oxyserica pedongensis (Ahrens, 1998)

Synonyms
- Microserica pedongensis Ahrens, 1998

Species of beetle

Oxyserica pedongensis is a species of beetle of the family Scarabaeidae. It is found in India (Darjeeling, Sikkim).

== Description ==
Adults reach a length of about 5.2 mm. They have a black, elongate body. The elytra are partly light brown. The dorsal surface is glabrous, except for the cilia along the margins.
