= Oxyserica kurseongana =

Scientific classification
- Kingdom: Animalia
- Phylum: Arthropoda
- Class: Insecta
- Order: Coleoptera
- Suborder: Polyphaga
- Infraorder: Scarabaeiformia
- Family: Scarabaeidae
- Genus: Oxyserica
- Species: O. kurseongana

Binomial name
- Oxyserica kurseongana (Moser, 1915)

Synonyms
- Microserica kurseongana Moser, 1915

Species of beetle

Oxyserica kurseongana is a species of beetle of the family Scarabaeidae. It is found in India (Darjeeling).

== Description ==
Adults reach a length of about 3.5 mm. They are slightly dull and opalescent. The frons and pronotum are blackish-green, while the elytra are black with a large, yellow basal spot and an indistinct yellow spot before the posterior margin. The underside is blackish-brown and the two anterior pairs of legs are lighter brown. The frons is rather sparsely punctate and has a row of setae behind the suture. The antennae are yellow, with a darkened club. The pronotum is moderately densely punctate and the anterior margin and the lateral margins are setate. The elytra have regular rows of punctures, with the spaces between them only very narrowly convex and sparsely punctured.
