= Trichotichnus nitidulus =

Scientific classification
- Domain: Eukaryota
- Kingdom: Animalia
- Phylum: Arthropoda
- Class: Insecta
- Order: Coleoptera
- Suborder: Adephaga
- Family: Carabidae
- Subfamily: Harpalinae
- Tribe: Harpalini
- Subtribe: Harpalina
- Genus: Trichotichnus
- Species: T. nitidulus

Binomial name
- Trichotichnus nitidulus (Chaudoir, 1843)

Synonyms
- Trichotichnus fulgens (Csiki, 1932)

Species of beetle

Trichotichnus nitidulus is a species in the beetle family Carabidae. It is found in the United States and Canada.
