= Umbopilio =

Scientific classification
- Domain: Eukaryota
- Kingdom: Animalia
- Phylum: Arthropoda
- Subphylum: Chelicerata
- Class: Arachnida
- Order: Opiliones
- Family: Sclerosomatidae
- Subfamily: Gagrellinae
- Genus: Umbopilio; Roewer, 1956

Genus of harvestmen

Umbopilio is a genus of harvestmen in the family Sclerosomatidae. There are at least two described species in Umbopilio.

== Species ==
These two species belong to the genus Umbopilio:

- Umbopilio martensi Klimeš, 2006 (India)
- Umbopilio paradoxus Roewer, 1956 (Myanmar)
