= Megarthrus =

Scientific classification
- Domain: Eukaryota
- Kingdom: Animalia
- Phylum: Arthropoda
- Class: Insecta
- Order: Coleoptera
- Suborder: Polyphaga
- Infraorder: Staphyliniformia
- Family: Staphylinidae
- Genus: Megarthrus; Curtis, 1829

Genus of beetles

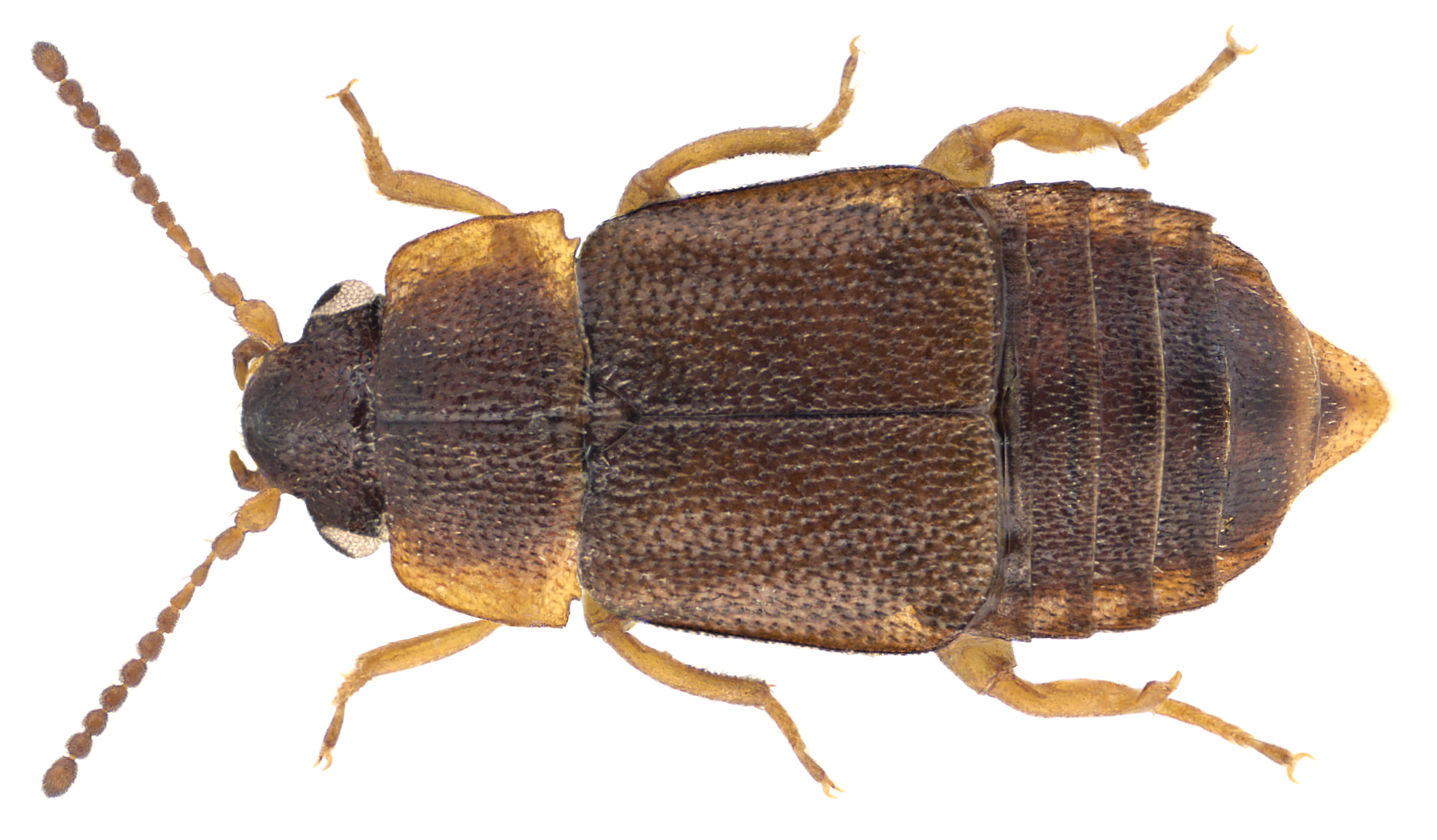
Megarthrus denticollis

Megarthrus is a genus of beetles belonging to the family Staphylinidae.

The genus has almost cosmopolitan distribution.

Species:

- Megarthrus abessinus Bernhauer, 1931
- Megarthrus adelphus Bierig, 1940
- Megarthrus africanus Eichelbaum, 1913
- Megarthrus aino Cuccodoro, 1996
- Megarthrus alatorreorum Rodríguez & Navarrete-Heredia, 2015
- Megarthrus alesi Cuccodoro, 2003
- Megarthrus alienus Cuccodoro, 1998
- Megarthrus alticola Cameron, 1924
- Megarthrus altivagans Bernhauer, 1929
- Megarthrus americanus Sachse, 1852
- Megarthrus andinus López-García, Méndez-Rojas & Navarrete-Heredia, 2011
- Megarthrus anggiensis Cuccodoro, 1998
- Megarthrus angulicollis Mäklin, 1852
- Megarthrus antennalis Cameron, 1941
- Megarthrus apicicornis Cameron, 1950
- Megarthrus arcuatus Hatch, 1957
- Megarthrus ashei Cuccodoro & Löbl, 1996
- Megarthrus atratus Mäklin, 1852
- Megarthrus auricola Cuccodoro, 1995
- Megarthrus balensis Cuccodoro, 1999
- Megarthrus baliemensis Cuccodoro, 1998
- Megarthrus bantu Cuccodoro & Löbl, 1995
- Megarthrus basicornis Fauvel, 1904
- Megarthrus basilewskyi Fagel, 1957
- Megarthrus bellevoyei Saulcy, 1862
- Megarthrus bierigi Cuccodoro, 2011
- Megarthrus bimaculatus Fauvel, 1904
- Megarthrus birmanus Fauvel, 1895
- Megarthrus borealis Cuccodoro & Löbl, 1996
- Megarthrus budai Liu & Cuccodoro, 2020
- Megarthrus calcaratus Coiffait, 1977
- Megarthrus cavianae Rodriguez, Navarrete-Heredia & Arriaga-Varela, 2020
- Megarthrus chiapas Rodríguez, Navarrete-Heredia, Arriaga-Varela & Cuccodoro, 2020
- Megarthrus chinese Li & Jingke, 1993
- Megarthrus chobauti Fauvel, 1902
- Megarthrus chujiao Liu & Cuccodoro, 2020
- Megarthrus clarkei Cuccodoro & Löbl, 1995
- Megarthrus con Cuccodoro, 2011
- Megarthrus conformis K.Sawada, 1962
- Megarthrus congoensis Cameron, 1950
- Megarthrus conspirator Cuccodoro, 1996
- Megarthrus constrictus Cuccodoro, 1996
- Megarthrus convexus Sharp, 1874
- Megarthrus coreanus Kim, Myoung Hee & Cuccodoro, 2011
- Megarthrus corticalis Sharp, 1889
- Megarthrus danieli Cuccodoro, 1999
- Megarthrus dentatus Coiffait, 1977
- Megarthrus denticollis (Beck, 1817)
- Megarthrus dentipes Bernhauer, 1938
- Megarthrus depressus (Paykull, 1789)
- Megarthrus dissymetricus Coiffait, 1977
- Megarthrus dominicae Cuccodoro & Löbl, 1995
- Megarthrus elevatus Coiffait, 1977
- Megarthrus excisus J.L.LeConte, 1863
- Megarthrus fakir Cuccodoro, 2003
- Megarthrus falasha Cuccodoro & Löbl, 1995
- Megarthrus fennicus Lahtinen, 1938
- Megarthrus festivus Cuccodoro, 2011
- Megarthrus fijianus Cuccodoro, 1998
- Megarthrus flavolimbatus Cameron, 1924
- Megarthrus flavosignatus Bierig, 1940
- Megarthrus geginati Cuccodoro, 2010
- Megarthrus gigas Fagel, 1957
- Megarthrus globulus Cuccodoro, 2011
- Megarthrus gressitti Cuccodoro, 1998
- Megarthrus harennaensis Cuccodoro, 1999
- Megarthrus heise Zhang, Cuccodoro, Chen & Liu, 2021
- Megarthrus hemipterus (Illiger, 1794)
- Megarthrus horticola Cuccodoro & Löbl, 1995
- Megarthrus hutu Cuccodoro & Löbl, 1995
- Megarthrus impressicollis Eppelsheim, 1893
- Megarthrus inaequalis Bierig, 1940
- Megarthrus incubifer Cuccodoro, 1996
- Megarthrus integricollis Coiffait, 1977
- Megarthrus ivani Cuccodoro, 2003
- Megarthrus japonicus Sharp, 1874
- Megarthrus kamerunensis Bernhauer, 1942
- Megarthrus kurbatovi Cuccodoro, 2018
- Megarthrus kuscheli Cuccodoro, 1998
- Megarthrus lanka Cuccodoro & Zhiping Liu, 2016
- Megarthrus lisae Cuccodoro, 2011
- Megarthrus loebli Cuccodoro, 2018
- Megarthrus longicornis Wollaston, 1854
- Megarthrus machu Cuccodoro, 2011
- Megarthrus magnicaudatus Cuccodoro & Löbl, 1995
- Megarthrus magnificus Cuccodoro, 2011
- Megarthrus mahnerti Cuccodoro & Löbl, 1995
- Megarthrus major Cuccodoro & Löbl, 1995
- Megarthrus malaisei Scheerpeltz, 1965
- Megarthrus mammiger Bierig, 1940
- Megarthrus maniwaata Cuccodoro & Löbl, 1995
- Megarthrus maronitus Fagel, 1968
- Megarthrus martensi Coiffait, 1982
- Megarthrus mastiger Bierig, 1940
- Megarthrus merabet Cuccodoro & Löbl, 1995
- Megarthrus metanas Cuccodoro, 2011
- Megarthrus minor Coiffait, 1977
- Megarthrus mirabilis Cuccodoro, 2011
- Megarthrus montanus K.Sawada, 1962
- Megarthrus monticola Cameron, 1942
- Megarthrus mukankundiyeorum Cuccodoro & Löbl, 1995
- Megarthrus mwami Cuccodoro & Löbl, 1995
- Megarthrus nanus Cuccodoro & Löbl, 1995
- Megarthrus narendrani Cuccodoro & Zhiping Liu, 2016
- Megarthrus negus Cuccodoro & Löbl, 1995
- Megarthrus newtoni Cuccodoro & Löbl, 1996
- Megarthrus nigerrima Cameron, 1941
- Megarthrus nigrinus J.Sahlberg, 1876
- Megarthrus nilgiriensis Cuccodoro & Zhiping Liu, 2016
- Megarthrus niloticus Cuccodoro & Löbl, 1995
- Megarthrus nitidulus Kraatz, 1857
- Megarthrus notabilis Cameron, 1941
- Megarthrus occidentalis Cuccodoro & Löbl, 1996
- Megarthrus octopus Cuccodoro, 2011
- Megarthrus ogloblini Bruch, 1940
- Megarthrus oromo Cuccodoro, 1999
- Megarthrus ovalis Cameron, 1950
- Megarthrus panga Cuccodoro & Löbl, 1995
- Megarthrus parallelus Sharp, 1874
- Megarthrus pecki Cuccodoro & Löbl, 1996
- Megarthrus peckorum Cuccodoro, 1998
- Megarthrus phoenix Cuccodoro, 2011
- Megarthrus pictus Motschulsky, 1845
- Megarthrus ping Cuccodoro, 2011
- Megarthrus primus Cuccodoro, 1995
- Megarthrus prosseni Schatzmayr, 1904
- Megarthrus ras Cuccodoro & Löbl, 1995
- Megarthrus riedeli Cuccodoro, 1998
- Megarthrus rougemonti Cuccodoro & Löbl, 1995
- Megarthrus rufomarginatus Cameron, 1914
- Megarthrus saddu Cuccodoro, 2003
- Megarthrus sawadai Cuccodoro, 1996
- Megarthrus scotti Cuccodoro & Löbl, 1995
- Megarthrus scriptus Sharp, 1889
- Megarthrus sculpticollis Coiffait, 1982
- Megarthrus selenitus Cuccodoro & Löbl, 1995
- Megarthrus septempunctatus Champion, 1925
- Megarthrus serrula Wollaston, 1865
- Megarthrus sexpunctatus Cameron, 1941
- Megarthrus shibatai K.Sawada, 1962
- Megarthrus simienensis Fagel, 1957
- Megarthrus smetanai Cuccodoro & Löbl, 1996
- Megarthrus solitarius Sharp, 1887
- Megarthrus spathuliformis Assing & Wunderle, 1999
- Megarthrus spinosus Cuccodoro & Löbl, 1995
- Megarthrus splendidus Cuccodoro, 2011
- Megarthrus stercorarius Mulsant & Rey, 1878
- Megarthrus strandi Scheerpeltz, 1931
- Megarthrus stylifer Cuccodoro & Löbl, 1995
- Megarthrus sumatrensis Cameron, 1928
- Megarthrus tac Cuccodoro, 2011
- Megarthrus taiwanus Cuccodoro, 2011
- Megarthrus tibialis Coiffait, 1977
- Megarthrus tic Cuccodoro, 2011
- Megarthrus trisinuatus Cameron, 1924
- Megarthrus twa Cuccodoro & Löbl, 1995
- Megarthrus uhligi Cuccodoro & Löbl, 1997
- Megarthrus umbonatus Fauvel, 1895
- Megarthrus vanschuytbroecki Cuccodoro & Löbl, 1995
- Megarthrus vastus Wendeler, 1926
- Megarthrus watutsi Cuccodoro & Löbl, 1995
- Megarthrus wayqecha Pérez, Rodríguez & Asenjo, 2020
- Megarthrus wittei Cameron, 1950
- Megarthrus wollastoni Cuccodoro & Löbl, 1997
- Megarthrus yeti Cuccodoro, 2003
- Megarthrus zekorum Cuccodoro & Löbl, 1997
- Megarthrus zerchei Cuccodoro & Löbl, 1997
- Megarthrus zulu Cuccodoro & Löbl, 1995
- Megarthrus zunilensis Sharp, 1887
