= Martensinus =

Scientific classification
- Kingdom: Animalia
- Phylum: Arthropoda
- Subphylum: Chelicerata
- Class: Arachnida
- Order: Araneae
- Infraorder: Araneomorphae
- Family: Linyphiidae
- Genus: Martensinus; Wunderlich, 1973

Type species
- M. micronetiformis Wunderlich, 1973

Species
- M. annulatus Wunderlich, 1973 – Nepal; M. micronetiformis Wunderlich, 1973 – Nepal

Genus of spiders

Martensinus is a genus of Asian dwarf spiders that was first described by J. Wunderlich in 1973. As of May 2019 it contains only two species, both found in Nepal: M. annulatus and M. micronetiformis.
