= Oxyserica martensi =

Scientific classification
- Kingdom: Animalia
- Phylum: Arthropoda
- Class: Insecta
- Order: Coleoptera
- Suborder: Polyphaga
- Infraorder: Scarabaeiformia
- Family: Scarabaeidae
- Genus: Oxyserica
- Species: O. martensi

Binomial name
- Oxyserica martensi (Ahrens, 1998)

Synonyms
- Microserica martensi Ahrens, 1998

Species of beetle

Oxyserica martensi is a species of beetle of the family Scarabaeidae. It is found in eastern Nepal.

== Description ==
Adults reach a length of about 5.8 mm. They have a black, oval body. The elytra are lighter brown. The dorsal surface is glabrous, except for the cilia along the margins.

== Etymology ==
The species is named for one of its collectors, Prof. Jochen Martens.
