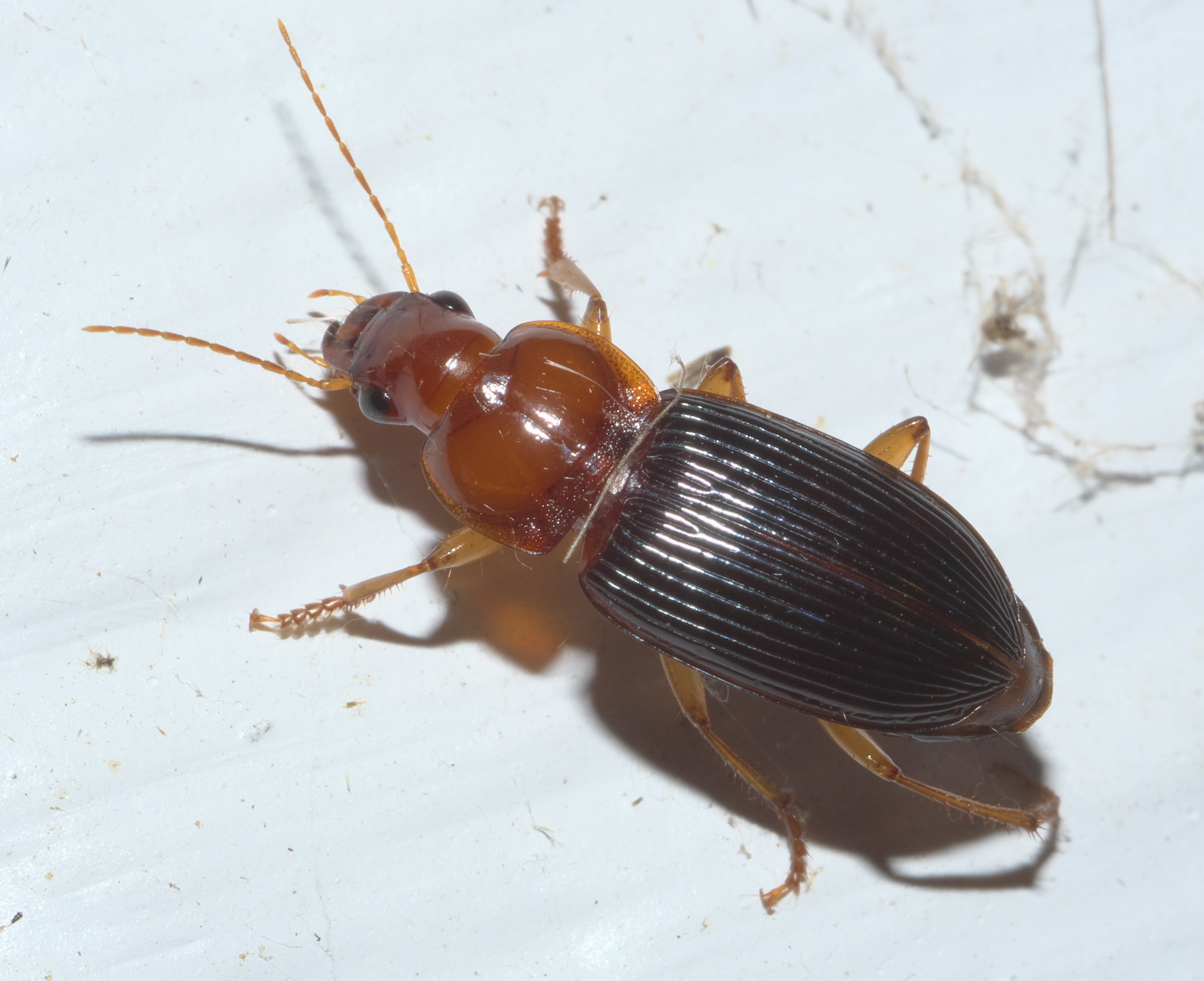
- Trichotichnus dichrous, Oklahoma

Scientific classification
- Domain: Eukaryota
- Kingdom: Animalia
- Phylum: Arthropoda
- Class: Insecta
- Order: Coleoptera
- Suborder: Adephaga
- Family: Carabidae
- Subfamily: Harpalinae
- Tribe: Harpalini
- Subtribe: Harpalina
- Genus: Trichotichnus; A. Morawitz, 1863

Subgenera
- Amaroschesis Tschitscherine, 1897; Bottchrus Jedlicka, 1935; Harpaloxenus Schauberger, 1933; Iridessus Bates, 1883; Parairidessus Kataev, 2020; Trichotichnus A.Morawitz, 1863

= Trichotichnus =

Genus of beetles

Trichotichnus is a genus of beetles in the family Carabidae.

== Species ==
Subgenus Amaroschesis Tschitscherine, 1897

Trichotichnus abnormis N.Ito, 2000
Trichotichnus acuticollis N.Ito, 2001
Trichotichnus angustatostriatus N.Ito, 1999
Trichotichnus arcipennis N.Ito, 2014
Trichotichnus bicolor (Tschitscherine, 1906)
Trichotichnus brevicollis N.Ito, 1998
Trichotichnus brunneomarginatus N.Ito, 1998
Trichotichnus brunneus N.Ito, 1998
Trichotichnus calathiformis N.Ito, 1999
Trichotichnus chinensis (Fairmaire, 1886)
Trichotichnus constrictus N.Ito, 2001
Trichotichnus cordaticollis Schauberger, 1936
Trichotichnus curticornis N.Ito, 1999
Trichotichnus curtipennis Schauberger, 1936
Trichotichnus curtus (Tschitscherine, 1906)
Trichotichnus davidi (Tschitscherine, 1897)
Trichotichnus delavayi (Tschitscherine, 1897)
Trichotichnus denticollis Schauberger, 1936
Trichotichnus emarginatibasis N.Ito, 1998
Trichotichnus emeiensis Kataev & N.Ito, 1999
Trichotichnus fedorenkoi Kataev & N.Ito, 1999
Trichotichnus flavipes (Tschitscherine, 1906)
Trichotichnus foveicollis N.Ito, 1998
Trichotichnus hayashii N.Ito, 1999
Trichotichnus hedini Schauberger, 1936
Trichotichnus hiroyukii N.Ito, 2007
Trichotichnus insignangularis N.Ito, 1999
Trichotichnus jedlickai (Schauberger, 1932)
Trichotichnus jizuensis N.Ito, 1998
Trichotichnus kazuyukii N.Ito, 1999
Trichotichnus kryzhanovskii Kataev & N.Ito, 1999
Trichotichnus kurbatovi Kataev & N.Ito, 1999
Trichotichnus langmusiensis N.Ito, 2001
Trichotichnus marginicollis N.Ito, 2014
Trichotichnus minor N.Ito, 1998
Trichotichnus minshanensis N.Ito, 1998
Trichotichnus modestus (Tschitscherine, 1906)
Trichotichnus nigrotibialis N.Ito, 1998
Trichotichnus nobuyoae N.Ito, 1999
Trichotichnus notabilangulatus N.Ito, 1998
Trichotichnus oblongipennis N.Ito, 2002
Trichotichnus oblongus (Tschitscherine, 1906)
Trichotichnus obscurus N.Ito, 2002
Trichotichnus obtusicollis Schauberger, 1936
Trichotichnus oreas (Bates, 1891)
Trichotichnus punctaticollis N.Ito, 1999
Trichotichnus reflexus N.Ito, 2001
Trichotichnus robustus N.Ito, 1999
Trichotichnus rotundatus N.Ito, 2007
Trichotichnus satanensis N.Ito, 2001
Trichotichnus satoi N.Ito, 1999
Trichotichnus setifer Kataev & N.Ito, 1999
Trichotichnus smetanai Kataev & N.Ito, 1999
Trichotichnus subiridis N.Ito, 2000
Trichotichnus subreticulatus N.Ito, 2006
Trichotichnus taichii Kataev & N.Ito, 1999
Trichotichnus triangulatus N.Ito, 2006
Trichotichnus tschitscherini Schauberger, 1936
Trichotichnus vulgaris (Tschitscherine, 1906)
Trichotichnus watanabei N.Ito, 2002
Trichotichnus yokoyamai N.Ito, 2006
Trichotichnus yukii N.Ito, 2005
Trichotichnus yunnanus (Fairmaire, 1887)
Trichotichnus zabriformis Schauberger, 1936

Subgenus Bottchrus Jedlicka, 1935

Trichotichnus altus Darlington, 1968
Trichotichnus amazeus (Clarke, 1971)
Trichotichnus baglungensis Kataev & J.Schmidt, 2017
Trichotichnus birmanicus Bates, 1892
Trichotichnus brancuccii Kataev & J.Schmidt, 2017
Trichotichnus brandti Darlington, 1968
Trichotichnus brunneiventralis N.Ito, 1999
Trichotichnus bubsaensis Kataev & J.Schmidt, 2017
Trichotichnus cyanescens N.Ito, 1998
Trichotichnus debilistriatus N.Ito, 1997
Trichotichnus dux Darlington, 1968
Trichotichnus formosus Schauberger, 1935
Trichotichnus fulgidius N.Ito, 1991
Trichotichnus ganeshensis Kataev & J.Schmidt, 2017
Trichotichnus globulipennis Schauberger, 1935
Trichotichnus gupchiensis Kataev & J.Schmidt, 2017
Trichotichnus guttula Darlington, 1968
Trichotichnus hiekei N.Ito, 1997
Trichotichnus hingstoni Andrewes, 1930
Trichotichnus holzschuhi Kirschenhofer, 1992
Trichotichnus horni Schauberger, 1935
Trichotichnus impunctatoventris N.Ito, 2014
Trichotichnus ivani Kataev & J.Schmidt, 2018
Trichotichnus javanus Andrewes, 1926
Trichotichnus jelineki N.Ito, 2009
Trichotichnus laevis N.Ito, 1997
Trichotichnus lamprus (Bates, 1886)
Trichotichnus laticeps Andrewes, 1930
Trichotichnus liothorax Schauberger, 1935
Trichotichnus loebli N.Ito, 1998
Trichotichnus maculipennis Baehr, 1997
Trichotichnus manasluensis Kataev & J.Schmidt, 2017
Trichotichnus martensi Kataev & J.Schmidt, 2017
Trichotichnus medius Darlington, 1968
Trichotichnus meghalayaensis N.Ito, 2016
Trichotichnus minutus Kataev & J.Schmidt, 2017
Trichotichnus miyakei Habu, 1980
Trichotichnus modus Darlington, 1968
Trichotichnus nanus Habu, 1954
Trichotichnus newtoni Kataev, 2016
Trichotichnus nigricans Schauberger, 1935
Trichotichnus nishikawai N.Ito, 2014
Trichotichnus notabilis N.Ito, 1997
Trichotichnus obliquebasalis Kataev & J.Schmidt, 2017
Trichotichnus obscurus Darlington, 1968
Trichotichnus opacus N.Ito, 1998
Trichotichnus panchhaseensis Kataev & J.Schmidt, 2017
Trichotichnus parvulus Kataev & J.Schmidt, 2017
Trichotichnus philippinus (Jedlicka, 1935)
Trichotichnus piceus N.Ito, 1991
Trichotichnus pusillus Kataev & J.Schmidt, 2017
Trichotichnus sataensis Habu & Nakane, 1955
Trichotichnus schawalleri Kataev & J.Schmidt, 2017
Trichotichnus semimas Darlington, 1968
Trichotichnus seramensis N.Ito, 1998
Trichotichnus sikkimensis Kataev & J.Schmidt, 2017
Trichotichnus siklesensis Kataev & J.Schmidt, 2017
Trichotichnus subaeneus N.Ito, 1997
Trichotichnus subcordicollis N.Ito, 1997
Trichotichnus sugimotoi Habu, 1975
Trichotichnus sumatrensis Andrewes, 1926
Trichotichnus taiwanus Habu, 1975
Trichotichnus tenuitibialis N.Ito, 2009
Trichotichnus uedai Morita, 2016
Trichotichnus uenoi Habu, 1969
Trichotichnus vietnamensis N.Ito, 2009

Subgenus Harpaloxenus Schauberger, 1933

Trichotichnus andoi N.Ito, 2014
Trichotichnus celebensis (Schauberger, 1933)
Trichotichnus fortis (Darlington, 1968)
Trichotichnus giganteus (N.Ito, 1991)
Trichotichnus mas (Darlington, 1968)
Trichotichnus persimilis N.Ito, 1996
Trichotichnus philippensis (Schauberger, 1933)
Trichotichnus pubescens N.Ito, 2014
Trichotichnus rasilis (Darlington, 1970)
Trichotichnus sakaii N.Ito, 1996
Trichotichnus schaubergeri N.Ito, 1996
Trichotichnus sedlaceki (Darlington, 1968)
Trichotichnus wau (Darlington, 1968)

Subgenus Iridessus Bates, 1883

Trichotichnus autumnalis (Say, 1823)
Trichotichnus claripes Lorenz, 1998
Trichotichnus koshiensis (Kirschenhofer, 1992)
Trichotichnus lautus (Andrewes, 1947)
Trichotichnus lucidus (A.Morawitz, 1863)
Trichotichnus merkli N.Ito, 2002
Trichotichnus nipponicus Habu, 1961
Trichotichnus nitidulus (Chaudoir, 1843)
Trichotichnus orientalis (Hope, 1845)
Trichotichnus ovatus N.Ito, 2014
Trichotichnus parvus N.Ito, 2001
Trichotichnus sasajii N.Ito, 2001
Trichotichnus shibatai Habu, 1973
Trichotichnus szekessyi (Jedlicka, 1954)
Trichotichnus tonklii Kirschenhofer, 1992

Subgenus Parairidessus Kataev, 2020
Trichotichnus perforatus Kataev, 2020
Trichotichnus saluki Kataev, 2020
Subgenus Trichotichnus A.Morawitz, 1863

Trichotichnus abei Morita, 1997
Trichotichnus agilis Tschitscherine, 1897
Trichotichnus akitai N.Ito, 2009
Trichotichnus alpinus Morita, 1997
Trichotichnus amagisanus N.Ito, 2005
Trichotichnus anthracinus Landin, 1955
Trichotichnus aquilo Andrewes, 1930
Trichotichnus arcuatomarginatus N.Ito, 2000
Trichotichnus armiger Morita, 1997
Trichotichnus asper Morita, 1997
Trichotichnus bouvieri (Tschitscherine, 1897)
Trichotichnus choukaisanus N.Ito, 2005
Trichotichnus chugokuensis N.Ito, 1996
Trichotichnus chuji Jedlicka, 1949
Trichotichnus congruus (Motschulsky, 1866)
Trichotichnus coruscus (Tschitscherine, 1895)
Trichotichnus cyrtops (Tschitscherine, 1906)
Trichotichnus daibosatsunis Kasahara, 1991
Trichotichnus daisenus Habu, 1973
Trichotichnus delicatus Darlington, 1968
Trichotichnus demarzi Baehr, 1983
Trichotichnus denarius Darlington, 1968
Trichotichnus depressus N.Ito, 1996
Trichotichnus dichrous (Dejean, 1829)
Trichotichnus doiinthanonensis N.Ito, 1997
Trichotichnus edai (Jedlicka, 1952)
Trichotichnus eikoae Morita, 1997
Trichotichnus emarginatus Andrewes, 1930
Trichotichnus flavipennis N.Ito & Liang, 2018
Trichotichnus flavomarginatus N.Ito, 2002
Trichotichnus formosanus Jedlicka, 1949
Trichotichnus fukuharai Habu, 1957
Trichotichnus furihatai Morita, 1997
Trichotichnus glabellus Andrewes, 1930
Trichotichnus glaber (Darlington, 1968)
Trichotichnus gracilis Morita, 1997
Trichotichnus hakusanus N.Ito, 2005
Trichotichnus hanmeii N.Ito, 2009
Trichotichnus hasensis Morita
Trichotichnus hayakawai Morita, 1997
Trichotichnus higonis Morita, 1997
Trichotichnus hiranishi Morita, 1997
Trichotichnus hirasawai Morita, 1997
Trichotichnus hisakoae Morita, 1997
Trichotichnus hisamatsui N.Ito, 2009
Trichotichnus hosodai N.Ito, 2005
Trichotichnus iidesanus N.Ito, 2005
Trichotichnus imafukui Habu, 1961
Trichotichnus impunctus Andrewes, 1947
Trichotichnus imurai Morita, 1997
Trichotichnus isamutanakai N.Ito, 1996
Trichotichnus ishidai N.Ito, 1996
Trichotichnus ishiharai N.Ito, 1994
Trichotichnus ishikawai Kasahara, 1992
Trichotichnus kantoonus Habu, 1961
Trichotichnus kasaharai Habu, 1983
Trichotichnus kishimotoi Morita, 1997, 1997
Trichotichnus kisonis Kasahara, 1995
Trichotichnus kitayatsuensus N.Ito, 2011
Trichotichnus klapperichi Jedlicka, 1953
Trichotichnus knauthi (Ganglbauer, 1901)
Trichotichnus kobayashie Habu, 1957
Trichotichnus kosakai Morita, 1997
Trichotichnus kurosai Habu, 1973
Trichotichnus laevicollis (Duftschmid, 1812)
Trichotichnus latemarginatus N.Ito, 1996
Trichotichnus leptopus (Bates, 1883)
Trichotichnus lewisi Schauberger, 1936
Trichotichnus liparus Andrewes, 1926
Trichotichnus longitarsis A.Morawitz, 1863
Trichotichnus luchti Louwerens, 1951
Trichotichnus lulinensis Habu, 1979
Trichotichnus malayanus N.Ito, 2001
Trichotichnus marubayashiorum N.Ito, 2005
Trichotichnus masaohayashii N.Ito, 1991
Trichotichnus masatakayoshidai N.Ito, 2005
Trichotichnus masumotoi N.Ito, 2011
Trichotichnus miser (Tschitscherine, 1897)
Trichotichnus miwai Jedlicka, 1949
Trichotichnus mixtus Darlington, 1968
Trichotichnus mizunoi N.Ito, 2005
Trichotichnus mongi Darlington, 1968
Trichotichnus monticola Kasahara, 1994
Trichotichnus narukawai Morita, 1997
Trichotichnus nenkaoshanensis N.Ito, 1997
Trichotichnus niger Louwerens, 1951
Trichotichnus nishioi Habu, 1961
Trichotichnus nitens (Heer, 1837)
Trichotichnus noctuabundus Habu, 1954
Trichotichnus ohkawai Morita, 1997
Trichotichnus ohkurai N.Ito, 1996
Trichotichnus ovaliformis N.Ito, 1994
Trichotichnus pacificatorius Habu, 1954
Trichotichnus parallelepunctatus Louwerens, 1951
Trichotichnus pauper (Tschitscherine, 1897)
Trichotichnus philippinus Jedlicka, 1936
Trichotichnus pictipennis N.Ito, 2005
Trichotichnus planicollis N.Ito, 2006
Trichotichnus potanini (Tschitscherine, 1906)
Trichotichnus quadratus N.Ito, 2014
Trichotichnus rimanus Schauberger, 1936
Trichotichnus septemtrionalis (Habu, 1947)
Trichotichnus shikokuensis Kasahara & Y.Ito, 1995
Trichotichnus shiragayamanus N.Ito, 2011
Trichotichnus silvestris Morita, 1997
Trichotichnus spinifer Kasahara, 1994
Trichotichnus storeyi Baehr, 1990
Trichotichnus straneoi (Louwerens, 1962)
Trichotichnus suzukii N.Ito, 2014
Trichotichnus teradai Habu, 1980
Trichotichnus tolgae Baehr, 1990
Trichotichnus tranquillus Habu, 1954
Trichotichnus trapezicollis N.Ito, 1997
Trichotichnus trusmadiensis N.Ito, 2008
Trichotichnus tsurugiyamanus Habu, 1959
Trichotichnus uenorum Kasahara & N.Ito, 1995
Trichotichnus vespertinus Habu, 1954
Trichotichnus vicinus (Tschitscherine, 1897)
Trichotichnus vulpeculus (Say, 1823)
Trichotichnus wansuiensis Habu, 1979
Trichotichnus watamukiensis N.Ito, 1996
Trichotichnus yasuhikoi N.Ito, 2014
Trichotichnus yatsuensis Morita, 1997
Trichotichnus yoriomiyatakei N.Ito, 1998
Trichotichnus yoshiroi Morita, 1997
Trichotichnus yoshiyukii N.Ito, 2005
Trichotichnus yukihikoi Habu, 1961
Trichotichnus yushanensis Habu, 1979
