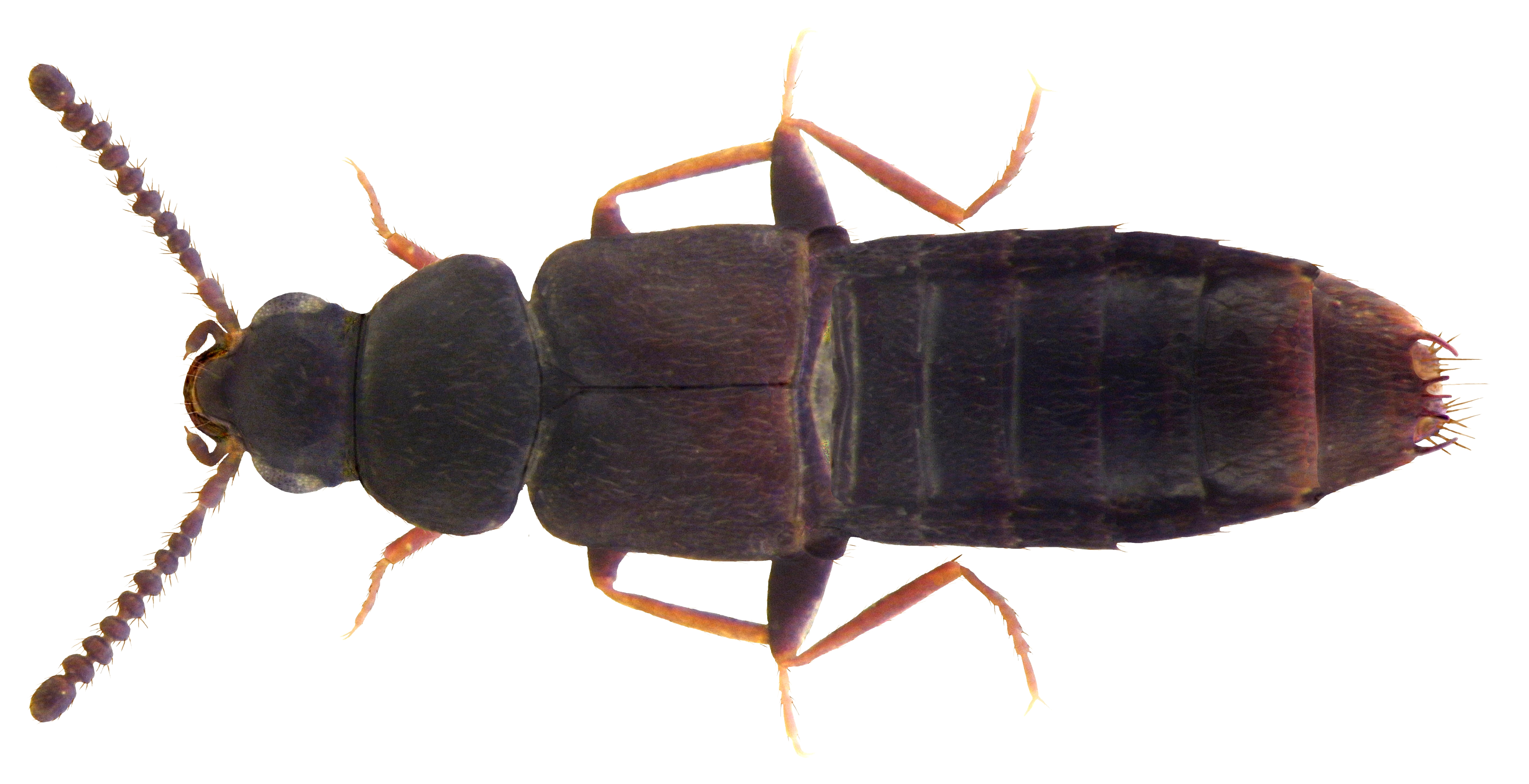
- Placusa atrata

Scientific classification
- Kingdom: Animalia
- Phylum: Arthropoda
- Clade: Pancrustacea
- Class: Insecta
- Order: Coleoptera
- Suborder: Polyphaga
- Infraorder: Staphyliniformia
- Family: Staphylinidae
- Subfamily: Aleocharinae
- Tribe: Placusini
- Genus: Placusa; Erichson, 1837

= Placusa =

Genus of beetles

Placusa is a genus of beetles belonging to the family Staphylinidae.

The genus has almost cosmopolitan distribution.

Species:

- Placusa acrotonoides Cameron, 1925
- Placusa acuminata Kraatz, 1859
