= Himalaphantes =

Scientific classification
- Kingdom: Animalia
- Phylum: Arthropoda
- Subphylum: Chelicerata
- Class: Arachnida
- Order: Araneae
- Infraorder: Araneomorphae
- Family: Linyphiidae
- Genus: Himalaphantes; Tanasevitch, 1992

Type species
- H. grandiculus (Tanasevitch, 1987)

Species
- 14, see text

Genus of spiders

Himalaphantes is a genus of Asian dwarf spiders that was first described by A. V. Tanasevitch in 1992.

== Species ==
As of January 2023 it contains fourteen species, found in China, India, Japan, Nepal, and Russia:

- Himalaphantes aduncus Irfan, Zhang & Peng, 2022 – China
- Himalaphantes arcuatus Zhang, Liu, Irfan & Peng, 2022 – China
- Himalaphantes auriculus Irfan, Zhang & Peng, 2022 – China
- Himalaphantes azumiensis (Oi, 1979) – Russia (Far East), China, Japan
- Himalaphantes fugongensis Irfan, Zhang & Peng, 2022 – China
- Himalaphantes grandiculus (Tanasevitch, 1987) (type) – Nepal
- Himalaphantes gyratus Irfan, Zhang & Peng, 2022 – China
- Himalaphantes lingulatus Zhang, Liu, Irfan & Peng, 2022 – China
- Himalaphantes magnus (Tanasevitch, 1987) – Nepal
- Himalaphantes martensi (Thaler, 1987) – India (Kashmir), Nepal
- Himalaphantes pseudoaduncus Irfan, Zhang & Peng, 2022 – China
- Himalaphantes pulae Irfan, Zhang & Peng, 2022 – China
- Himalaphantes uncatus Zhang, Liu, Irfan & Peng, 2022 – China
- Himalaphantes zhangmuensis (Hu, 2001) – China
