= Euconnus intrusus =

Scientific classification
- Kingdom: Animalia
- Phylum: Arthropoda
- Clade: Pancrustacea
- Class: Insecta
- Order: Coleoptera
- Suborder: Polyphaga
- Infraorder: Staphyliniformia
- Family: Staphylinidae
- Genus: Euconnus
- Species: E. intrusus

Binomial name
- Euconnus intrusus (Schaum, 1844)

Synonyms
- Scydmaenus intrusus Schaum, 1844; Euconnus birnbacheri Ganglbauer, 1900

Species of beetle

Euconnus intrusus, is a species of ant-like stone beetle found in Albania, Samos, Iran and Sri Lanka.
