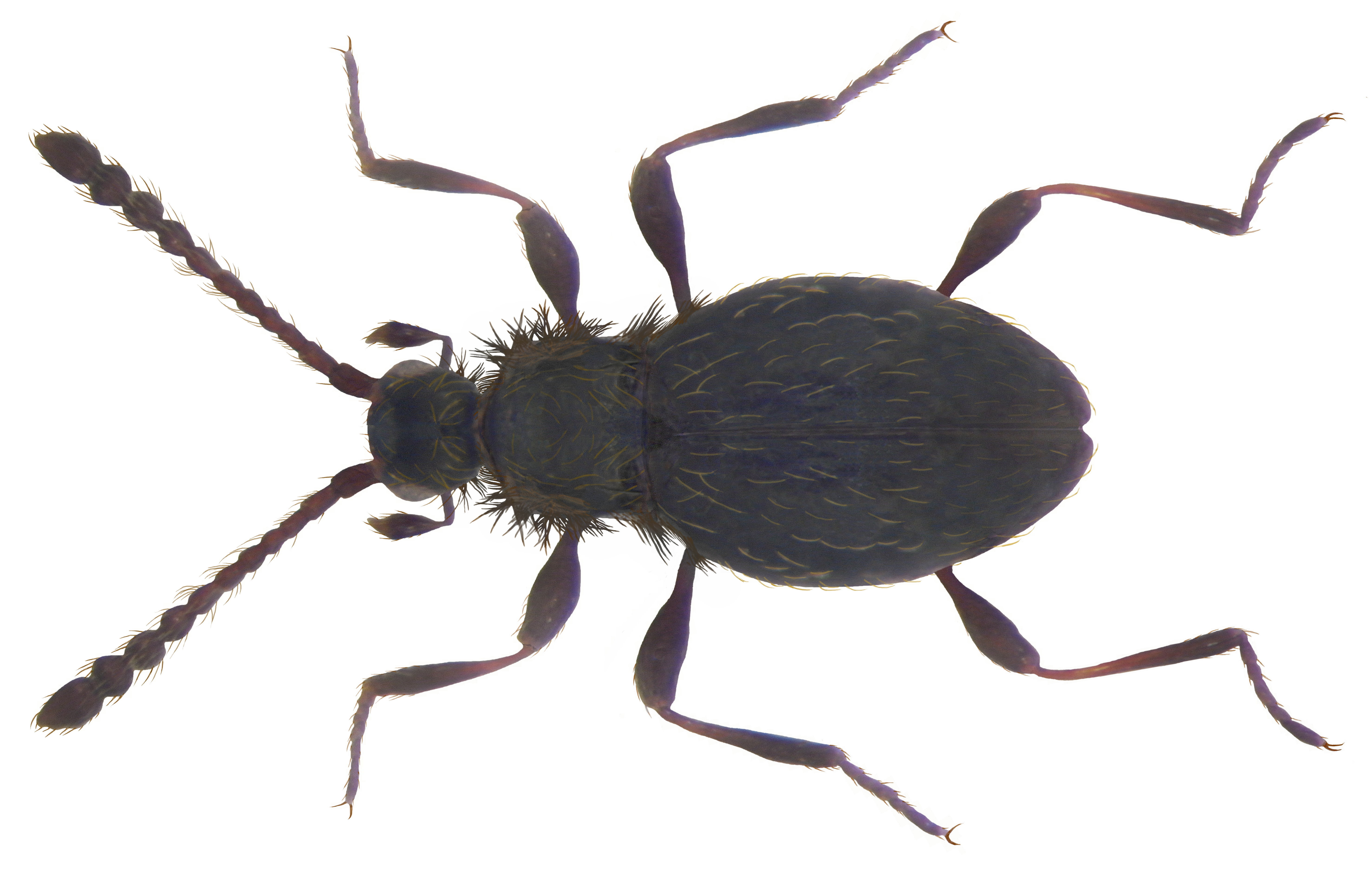
- Euconnus fimetarius

Scientific classification
- Kingdom: Animalia
- Phylum: Arthropoda
- Clade: Pancrustacea
- Class: Insecta
- Order: Coleoptera
- Suborder: Polyphaga
- Infraorder: Staphyliniformia
- Family: Staphylinidae
- Subfamily: Scydmaeninae
- Supertribe: Scydmaenitae
- Tribe: Stenichnini
- Genus: Euconnus; Thomson, C. G., 1859

Synonyms
- Alloconophron Franz, 1986; Allonapochus Franz, 1972; Androconnus Franz, 1986; Anthicimorphus Franz, 1986; Borneoconnus Franz, 1992; Cerviconnus Franz, 1962; Cervinoconnus Franz, 1961; Cladoconnus Reitter, 1909; Connophron Casey, 1897; Diarthroconnus Ganglbauer, 1900; Dimorphoconnus Franz, 1975; Drasterophus Franz, 1985; Euconnoides Croissandeau, 1898; Euconophron Reitter, 1909; Eupentarius Reitter, 1907; Filonapochus Franz, 1986; Glandularia Schaufuss, 1889; Heteroconnus Franz, 1963; Himalayaconnus Franz, 1979; Microconnus Franz, 1994; Myrmecodites Csiki, 1919; Myrmecodytes Croissandeau, 1898; Neonapochus Machulka, 1929; Nepaloconnus Franz, 1979; Nodoconnus Franz, 1986; Nudatoconnus Franz, 1980; Palaeoconnus Franz, 1995; Paranapochus Franz, 1985; Paratetramelus Franz, 1963; Psocophus Franz, 1994; Psomophus Casey, 1897; Pycnophus Casey, 1897; Rhomboconnus Franz, 1986; Scopophus Casey, 1897; Scydmaenites Croissandeau, 1898; Smicrophus Casey, 1897; Spanioconnus Ganglbauer, 1899; Ursoconnus Franz, 1963; Xestophus Casey, 1897

= Euconnus =

Genus of beetles

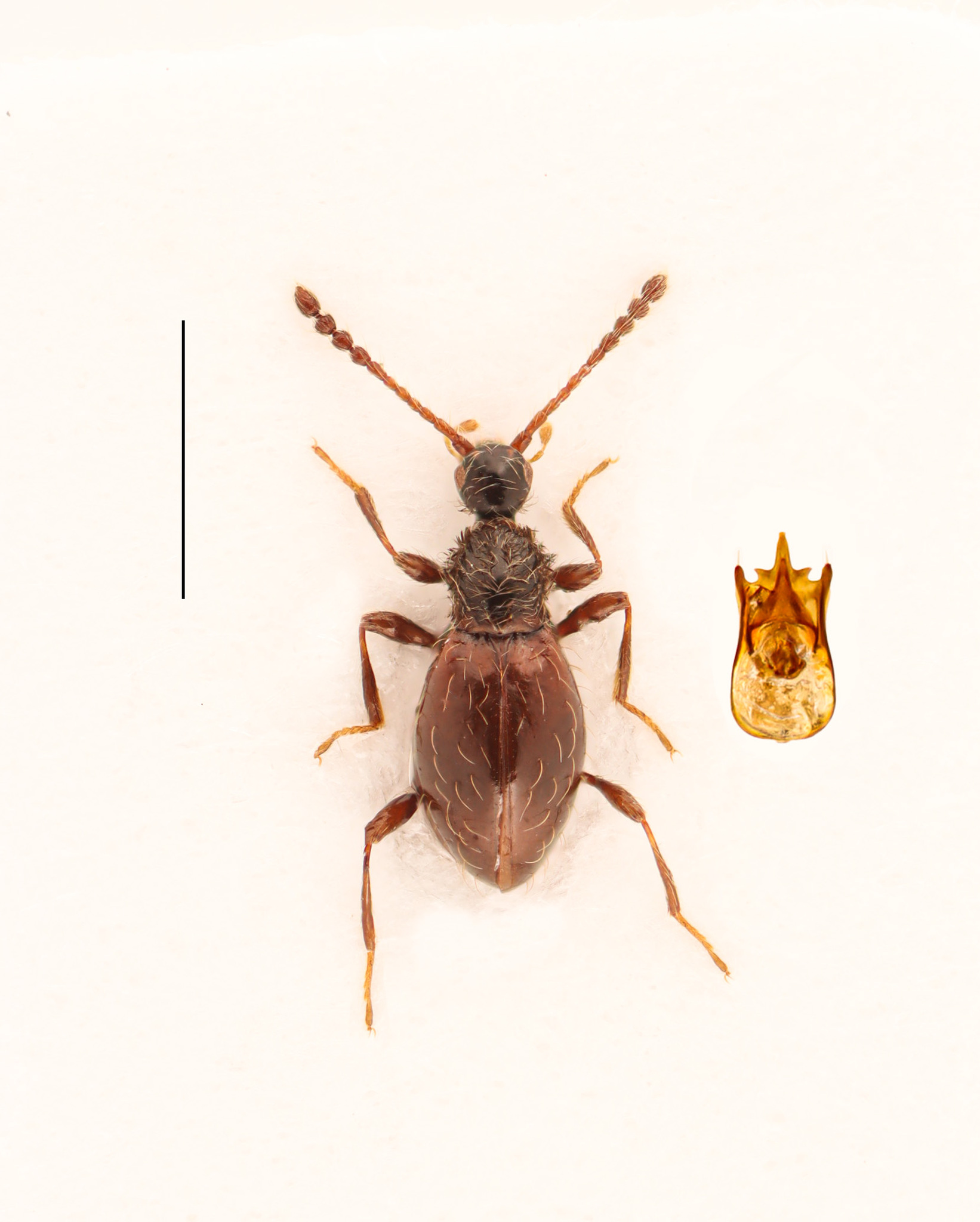
Euconnus clavipes, Canada

Euconnus is a genus of rove beetles in the family Staphylinidae. There are more than 2,500 described species in Euconnus, found worldwide.

37 subgenera of Euconnus were formerly recognized, but recent research has resulted in fewer than 20 genera.

== Euconnus subgenera ==
According to Catalog of Life (2025) and StaphBase, these 11 subgenera are members of Euconnus.

- Androconnus Franz, 1986 (31 species)
- Austroconophron Franz, 1971 (21 species)
- Borneoconnus Franz, 1992 (3 species)
- Cladoconnus Reitter, 1909 (38 species)
- Euconnus (1,003 species)
- Glabriconnus Jałoszyński, 2016 (6 species)
- Madagassoconnus Franz, 1986 (28 species)
- Nodoconnus Franz, 1986 (3 species)
- Oneila Péringuey, 1899 (11 species)
- Rhomboconnus Franz, 1986 (19 species)
- Tetramelus Motschulsky, 1869 (229 species)

About 1200 species are unassigned to subgenus. About 1000 species are members of the subgenus Euconnus, Tetramelus contains 229 species, and none of the remaining subgenera have more than 40 species. Further research will likely change these numbers in the future.

== Euconnus species ==
These species are members of the genus Euconnus.

- Euconnus abachausi Franz, 1984
- Euconnus abejanus Franz, 1991
- Euconnus aberdarensis Franz, 1963
- Euconnus aberrans Stephan & Chandler, 2021
- Euconnus abkhazicus Hlaváč, 1997
- Euconnus abnormeantennatus Franz, 1984
- Euconnus abnormicornis Franz, 1994
- Euconnus abnormis Reitter & Croissandeau, 1890
- Euconnus abundans (Lea, 1915)
- Euconnus aceitillari Franz, 1991
- Euconnus aconquijae Franz, 1967
- Euconnus aculeatus Franz, 1983
- Euconnus aculeifer Franz, 1985
- Euconnus acuminatus Stephan & Chandler, 2021
- Euconnus acuteantennatus Franz, 1981
- Euconnus acuticephalus Stephan & O'Keefe, 2021
- Euconnus acuticornis Franz, 1992
- Euconnus acutipennis (Casey, 1897)
- Euconnus adelaidensis Franz, 1975
- Euconnus adustus Stephan & Chandler, 2021
- Euconnus aelurus Bonadona, 1950
- Euconnus aethiops Reitter, 1882
- Euconnus affinis Casey, 1897
- Euconnus africanus Croissandeau, 1894
- Euconnus africus Castellini, 2010
- Euconnus afrohortonensis Franz, 1979
- Euconnus agbovilleanus Franz, 1980
- Euconnus agbovillensis Franz, 1980
- Euconnus agilis Cauchois, 1955
- Euconnus agiraffa Jałoszyński, 2020
- Euconnus aguaceroi Franz, 1994
- Euconnus akane Hoshina, 2020
- Euconnus akurensis Franz, 1977
- Euconnus alabama Stephan & Chandler, 2021
- Euconnus alawalanus Franz, 1982
- Euconnus alcanfonae Franz, 1994
- Euconnus alcanfonensis Franz, 1994
- Euconnus alcides (Saulcy, 1870)
- Euconnus alcidiae Franz, 1980
- Euconnus alcochensis Franz, 1980
- Euconnus alesi Vít, 2011
- Euconnus algarvensis Franz, 1962
- Euconnus alienus Franz, 1986
- Euconnus alishanicus Franz, 1985
- Euconnus alishaniformis Franz, 1985
- Euconnus allemandi Orousset, 2015
- Euconnus alloapicalis Franz, 1980
- Euconnus allocervinus Franz, 1981
- Euconnus alloceylonensis Franz, 1982
- Euconnus allocolomboanus Franz, 1982
- Euconnus allocoloniae Franz, 1989
- Euconnus alloconoides Franz, 1989
- Euconnus allocrinitus Franz, 1971
- Euconnus allodecellei Franz, 1984
- Euconnus allofissipenis Franz, 1980
- Euconnus alloglabripennis Franz, 1975
- Euconnus allogulosus Franz, 1975
- Euconnus allohortonensis Franz, 1982
- Euconnus alloindicus Franz, 1973
- Euconnus allolongeantennatus Franz, 1980
- Euconnus allomirus Franz, 1992
- Euconnus allonkwantanus Franz, 1984
- Euconnus allonuwaranus Franz, 1982
- Euconnus alloprocerior Franz, 1984
- Euconnus alloquillabambanus Franz, 1967
- Euconnus allorhododendri Franz, 1973
- Euconnus alloscydmaenoides Franz, 1967
- Euconnus allosetosipennis Franz, 1991
- Euconnus allospectator Franz, 1984
- Euconnus allospinosus Franz, 1993
- Euconnus allosukhotanus Franz, 1992
- Euconnus allotestaceus Franz, 1991
- Euconnus allothailandicus Franz, 1985
- Euconnus allotovarianus Franz, 1989
- Euconnus allotuxtlanus Franz, 1994
- Euconnus alluaudi (Franz, 1986)
- Euconnus alluvionum Franz, 1975
- Euconnus almandoensis Franz, 1991
- Euconnus alneti Franz, 1973
- Euconnus altamirensis Franz, 1989
- Euconnus alticola Sharp, 1887
- Euconnus altitudinis Franz, 1982
- Euconnus altomontanus Franz, 1960
- Euconnus alutoyanus Franz, 1982
- Euconnus amanii Franz, 1991
- Euconnus amatlanensis Franz, 1994
- Euconnus amazonas O'Keefe, 2000
- Euconnus amazoniae Franz, 1980
- Euconnus amazonicus Franz, 1980
- Euconnus ambatolaonus Franz, 1986
- Euconnus ambelosicus Meybohm, 2017
- Euconnus ambodivoangyanus Franz, 1986
- Euconnus ambodivoangyi (Franz, 1986)
- Euconnus americanus Lhoste, 1953
- Euconnus amieuensis Franz, 1971
- Euconnus amieui Franz, 1971
- Euconnus amlekhganjensis Franz, 1974
- Euconnus amoenus Reitter, 1883
- Euconnus amonaragalanus Jałoszyński, 2011
- Euconnus amplipennis (Lea, 1915)
- Euconnus amplus Franz, 1979
- Euconnus analis (LeConte, J. L., 1852)
- Euconnus analogus Franz, 1963
- Euconnus anandi Makhan, 1997
- Euconnus anatolicus Franz, 1997
- Euconnus anayaguae Franz, 1989
- Euconnus andapensis Franz, 1986
- Euconnus andersoni Stephan & O'Keefe, 2021
- Euconnus anderssoni Franz, 1982
- Euconnus andoboanus (Franz, 1986)
- Euconnus andoboensis Franz, 1986
- Euconnus andranofotsyanus Franz, 1986
- Euconnus andranofotsyi Franz, 1986
- Euconnus andranomenaus Jałoszyński, 2016
- Euconnus andringitrae Franz, 1986
- Euconnus andringitrides Jałoszyński & Newton, 2020
- Euconnus angtseringensis Franz, 1973
- Euconnus angusticeps (Nietner, 1856)
- Euconnus angusticollis (Casey, 1897)
- Euconnus angustipenis Franz, 1986
- Euconnus angustus Franz, 1980
- Euconnus animae Franz, 1967
- Euconnus ankazobensis Franz, 1986
- Euconnus ankofensis Franz, 1986
- Euconnus anophthalmus Franz, 1979
- Euconnus antennatus (Schaufuss, L. W., 1866)
- Euconnus antongilanides Jałoszyński & Newton, 2020
- Euconnus antongilanus Franz, 1986
- Euconnus anuradhapurae Lhoste, 1939
- Euconnus anuradhapuranus Franz, 1982
- Euconnus apfelbecki Csiki, 1919
- Euconnus apiaoi Franz, 1994
- Euconnus apicalis Franz, 1963
- Euconnus apicedepressus Franz, 1985
- Euconnus apicefoveatus Franz, 1980
- Euconnus apicefurcatus Franz, 1992
- Euconnus appalachianus Stephan & Chandler, 2021
- Euconnus appendiculatus (Schaufuss, L. W., 1889)
- Euconnus appropinquanus Lea, 1915
- Euconnus apterus Franz, 1979
- Euconnus arabiae Alonso-Zarazaga, 2004
- Euconnus araguaensis O'Keefe, 2000
- Euconnus araguai Lhoste, 1953
- Euconnus araguanus Franz, 1986
- Euconnus araucariae Franz, 1967
- Euconnus arboriformis Franz, 1980
- Euconnus archboldi Stephan & O'Keefe, 2021
- Euconnus arctos Castellini, 2010
- Euconnus arduiformis Franz, 1985
- Euconnus arduus Franz, 1977
- Euconnus arganoi Franz, 1977
- Euconnus argentinicola Franz, 1993
- Euconnus argentinus (Brèthes, 1922)
- Euconnus argodi Croissandeau, 1893
- Euconnus argostolius Reitter, 1884
- Euconnus aridulus Reitter & Croissandeau, 1890
- Euconnus arii Franz, 1967
- Euconnus arionis Reitter & Croissandeau, 1890
- Euconnus arizonicus Stephan & Chandler, 2021
- Euconnus armatipenis Franz, 1963
- Euconnus armatipes Sharp, 1887
- Euconnus armatissimus Franz, 1980
- Euconnus armidalensis Franz, 1975
- Euconnus arthuri O'Keefe, 2000
- Euconnus arthuris Franz, 1975
- Euconnus aschnae Makhan, 1997
- Euconnus astrictus Franz, 1977
- Euconnus asymmetricus Stephan & Chandler, 2021
- Euconnus ater Casey, 1897
- Euconnus aterrimus Franz, 1986
- Euconnus athertonensis Franz, 1994
- Euconnus athertoni Franz, 1994
- Euconnus atlanticus Franz, 1957
- Euconnus atlantoafricanus Franz, 1961
- Euconnus atricapillus Reitter, 1882
- Euconnus atrophus (Lea, 1915)
- Euconnus auberti Franz, 1963
- Euconnus auriculatus Franz, 1980
- Euconnus auritus Sharp, 1887
- Euconnus aurosericeus Reitter, 1882
- Euconnus autem Castellini, 1985
- Euconnus ayderinus Vít, 1997
- Euconnus azoricus Franz, 1969 (Ant-like stone beetle)
- Euconnus azulitanus Franz, 1989
- Euconnus babahrotensis Franz, 1984
- Euconnus baccettii Castellini, 2010
- Euconnus bachmamontanus Jałoszyński & Nomura, 2018
- Euconnus bacilliformis Franz, 1963
- Euconnus bacillum Franz, 1977
- Euconnus baculiger Csiki, 1919
- Euconnus badeggii Franz, 1977
- Euconnus badullae Franz, 1982
- Euconnus badullanus Franz, 1982
- Euconnus bafutensis Franz, 1985
- Euconnus baguenai Franz, 1977
- Euconnus bahiae Franz, 1993
- Euconnus bahianus Franz, 1993
- Euconnus bahrami Makhan & Ezzatpanah, 2011
- Euconnus bairianus Franz, 1974
- Euconnus bakeri (Blattný, C., 1929)
- Euconnus bakerianus Blattný, C., 1929
- Euconnus balangodae Franz, 1982
- Euconnus balangodanus Franz, 1982
- Euconnus balangodensis Franz, 1982
- Euconnus balcanicus Karaman, 1973
- Euconnus baloghi Franz, 1979
- Euconnus banari Jałoszyński, 2016
- Euconnus bandaensis Franz, 1984
- Euconnus bandai Franz, 1984
- Euconnus bangkokensis Franz, 1989
- Euconnus banii Franz, 1984
- Euconnus barahbiseanus Franz, 1973
- Euconnus barbatus Reitter, 1880
- Euconnus barbifer Franz, 1984
- Euconnus barrinoensis Franz, 1975
- Euconnus bartoloanus Franz, 1994
- Euconnus bartolozzii Castellini, 2010
- Euconnus baruerii Franz, 1980
- Euconnus basalis (LeConte, J. L., 1852)
- Euconnus basifurcatus (Blattný, C., 1935)
- Euconnus basilewskyi Franz, 1962
- Euconnus basutoanus Franz, 1967
- Euconnus batavianus Reitter, 1883
- Euconnus bazgoviensis Vít & Hlaváč, 2005
- Euconnus bechyneae Franz, 1986
- Euconnus bechyneanus Franz, 1989
- Euconnus bechyneensis Franz, 1989
- Euconnus beckeri Franz, 1975
- Euconnus becki Franz, 1980
- Euconnus beckianus Franz, 1989
- Euconnus bedeli Reitter, 1885
- Euconnus beechmontensis Franz, 1975
- Euconnus begunanus Franz, 1981
- Euconnus beiranus Franz, 1979
- Euconnus belemensis Franz, 1983
- Euconnus belemianus Franz, 1983
- Euconnus belingaensis Franz, 1987
- Euconnus bengalensis Franz, 1979
- Euconnus benicola Franz, 1980
- Euconnus beniensis Franz, 1980
- Euconnus beninensis Franz, 1977
- Euconnus berentyensis Franz, 1986
- Euconnus berrinei Franz, 1994
- Euconnus besuchetianus Franz, 1982
- Euconnus betancuri Franz, 1994
- Euconnus bhutanensis Franz, 1975
- Euconnus biafranus Franz, 1961
- Euconnus biakensis Franz, 1975
- Euconnus biamnis Castellini, 2010
- Euconnus bibilensis Franz, 1982
- Euconnus bicarinatus Jałoszyński, 2020
- Euconnus bicaudatus Franz, 1957
- Euconnus bicavifrons Franz, 1973
- Euconnus bicavus Stephan & Chandler, 2021
- Euconnus biceps (Casey, 1897)
- Euconnus bicolor (Fabricius, 1801)
- Euconnus bicornipenis Franz, 1984
- Euconnus bicornipenisides Newton, 2017
- Euconnus bicornis Cauchois, 1955
- Euconnus bifasciculatus (Lea, 1912)
- Euconnus bifoveatiformis Franz, 1991
- Euconnus bifoveatus Cauchois, 1955
- Euconnus bifoveicollis Franz, 1984
- Euconnus bifoveolatus (Schaufuss, L. W., 1866)
- Euconnus bifurcatus Stephan & Chandler, 2021
- Euconnus bigii Castellini, 2010
- Euconnus biimpressicollis Franz, 1988
- Euconnus biimpressus (Schaufuss, L. W., 1866)
- Euconnus bijepuranus Franz, 1981
- Euconnus bilatus (Schaufuss, L. W., 1884)
- Euconnus binaraiae Makhan, 1997
- Euconnus bingervilleanus Franz, 1980
- Euconnus bioculatus (Schaufuss, L. W., 1889)
- Euconnus biokovensis Müller, J., 1908
- Euconnus birganyensis Franz, 1974
- Euconnus birgary O'Keefe, 2000
- Euconnus bisorientalis Jałoszyński, 2011
- Euconnus blattnyi Franz, 1984
- Euconnus blydepoorti Franz, 1984
- Euconnus blyderiveri Franz, 1984
- Euconnus boavistae Franz, 1967
- Euconnus boavistensis O'Keefe, 2000
- Euconnus bobirianus Franz, 1963
- Euconnus bobiriensis Franz, 1984
- Euconnus bobyensis Franz, 1986
- Euconnus boconoi Franz, 1988
- Euconnus bodemeyeri Reitter, 1903
- Euconnus boesmani Franz, 1984
- Euconnus boletanus Franz, 1982
- Euconnus boletipenis Franz, 1989
- Euconnus boliviensis O'Keefe, 2000
- Euconnus bolonchenensis Franz, 1994
- Euconnus bolteri Stephan & Chandler, 2021
- Euconnus boopis Castellini, 2007
- Euconnus bopathellanus Franz, 1982
- Euconnus bordonensis Franz, 1989
- Euconnus borealis Stephan & O'Keefe, 2021
- Euconnus boreoceylanicus Franz, 1982
- Euconnus borneoensis Franz, 1992
- Euconnus borneoi Franz, 1992
- Euconnus borneoprotectus Jałoszyński, 2011
- Euconnus borneotubus Jałoszyński, 2011
- Euconnus boulayanus Franz, 1975
- Euconnus brachati Hlaváč & Stevanović, 2013
- Euconnus bradypodus (Schaufuss, L. W., 1884)
- Euconnus brandensis Franz, 1979
- Euconnus brandi Franz, 1979
- Euconnus brandianus Franz, 1979
- Euconnus brazos Stephan & O'Keefe, 2021
- Euconnus brazzavillae Franz, 1963
- Euconnus brazzavilleanus Franz, 1980
- Euconnus bremeri Franz, 1983
- Euconnus bremerianus Castellini, 2010
- Euconnus brenskeanus Reitter, 1884
- Euconnus breveclavatus Franz, 1983
- Euconnus breviceps (Schaufuss, L. W., 1866)
- Euconnus brevicornis (Say, 1824)
- Euconnus brevior Franz, 1984
- Euconnus brevipennides Newton, 2017
- Euconnus brevipennis Franz, 1975
- Euconnus brevipilis (Lea, 1915)
- Euconnus brevis Franz, 1963
- Euconnus brevisetosus (Lea, 1915)
- Euconnus brevitarsis Franz, 1986
- Euconnus breytenbachae Franz, 1984
- Euconnus brignolii Castellini, 2007
- Euconnus brinchangi Franz, 1970
- Euconnus brinchangianus Franz, 1990
- Euconnus brinckianus Franz, 1967
- Euconnus brongahafoi Franz, 1984
- Euconnus brouni Franz, 1975
- Euconnus bryanti Lhoste, 1939
- Euconnus bucephalus Franz, 1980
- Euconnus buenfilanus Franz, 1994
- Euconnus buenfilensis Franz, 1994
- Euconnus bugirii Franz, 1962
- Euconnus buiensis Franz, 1984
- Euconnus bulbiceps Franz, 1989
- Euconnus bulbulanus Franz, 1974
- Euconnus bulgaricus Rambousek, 1909
- Euconnus bulirschi Hlaváč, 1997
- Euconnus bumbunae Castellini, 2010
- Euconnus bundukianus Franz, 1963
- Euconnus bundukii Franz, 1962
- Euconnus burckhardti Franz, 1989
- Euconnus burckhardtianus Franz, 1989
- Euconnus burmanus Franz, 1984
- Euconnus burundianus Franz, 1987
- Euconnus busillis Castellini, 2007
- Euconnus butemboanus Franz, 1971
- Euconnus buttalanus Franz, 1982
- Euconnus buyckxi Franz, 1957
- Euconnus caborojoanus Franz, 1991
- Euconnus caborojoi Franz, 1991
- Euconnus cacauensis Franz, 1983
- Euconnus caeculus Peyerimhoff, 1907
- Euconnus caecus Reitter, 1894
- Euconnus caguanus Franz, 1989
- Euconnus cairnsi Franz, 1975
- Euconnus cairnsianus Franz, 1975
- Euconnus cairnsicola Franz, 1975
- Euconnus cairnsiensis Franz, 1975
- Euconnus calcagnoi Castellini, 2007
- Euconnus calcaratoides Stephan & Chandler, 2021
- Euconnus calcaratus (Casey, 1897)
- Euconnus calcarifer Franz, 1980
- Euconnus calcicola Franz, 1971
- Euconnus caledonensides Newton, 2017
- Euconnus caledonensis Franz, 1979
- Euconnus caledonus Franz, 1979
- Euconnus callidus Casey, 1897
- Euconnus calviceps (Lea, 1915)
- Euconnus calvides Newton, 2017
- Euconnus calvus (Broun, 1880)
- Euconnus camerunanus Franz, 1985
- Euconnus camerunensis (Franz, 1985)
- Euconnus camerunis Franz, 1962
- Euconnus campanaeformis Franz, 1994
- Euconnus campanipenis Franz, 1982
- Euconnus campestris (Schaufuss, L. W., 1866)
- Euconnus camponotorum Franz, 1980
- Euconnus canaimae Franz, 1994
- Euconnus canaimaensis Franz, 1994
- Euconnus cantabricus Franz, 1957
- Euconnus capensiformis Franz, 1984
- Euconnus capensis Lhoste, 1939
- Euconnus capillaris (Schaufuss, L. W., 1889)
- Euconnus capillatus Franz, 1962
- Euconnus capillosulus (LeConte, J. L., 1852)
- Euconnus capitaopocoi Franz, 1983
- Euconnus capitatus Casey, 1897
- Euconnus capitemicans Franz, 1984
- Euconnus caracasiensis Lhoste, 1953
- Euconnus carbonerae Franz, 1986
- Euconnus carboneranus Franz, 1989
- Euconnus carbonericola Franz, 1988
- Euconnus caribicus Franz, 1984
- Euconnus carinangulus Reitter & Croissandeau, 1890
- Euconnus carinatus Cauchois, 1955
- Euconnus cariniceps Franz, 1982
- Euconnus carinifer Franz, 1980
- Euconnus carinifrons Franz, 1975
- Euconnus carinthiacus Ganglbauer, 1896
- Euconnus caripensis Franz, 1989
- Euconnus carlettiae Castellini, 2010
- Euconnus carlosbordoni Franz, 1986
- Euconnus carltoni Stephan & O'Keefe, 2021
- Euconnus caroli Franz, 1980
- Euconnus carpanetoi Castellini, 2007
- Euconnus carvachiensis Franz, 1986
- Euconnus caseyi Csiki, 1919
- Euconnus castaneoglaber (Lea, 1910)
- Euconnus castaneus (Schaum, 1841)
- Euconnus castanicolor Franz, 1980
- Euconnus castawayensis Franz, 1975
- Euconnus castellinii Franz, 1972
- Euconnus castroi Franz, 1994
- Euconnus catae Franz, 1989
- Euconnus cataensis Franz, 1989
- Euconnus catalanus Franz, 1960
- Euconnus catalinus Stephan & Chandler, 2021
- Euconnus catanus Franz, 1988
- Euconnus catharinensis Franz, 1980
- Euconnus catherinae Franz, 1980
- Euconnus catus Cauchois, 1955
- Euconnus cauaburiformis Franz, 1989
- Euconnus cauaburii Franz, 1980
- Euconnus cauchoisi Franz, 1962
- Euconnus cautorum Franz, 1971
- Euconnus caviceps (Casey, 1897)
- Euconnus cavicepsides Newton, 2017
- Euconnus cavifrons (Schaufuss, L. W., 1866)
- Euconnus cavipennis Casey, 1897
- Euconnus cazabitae Franz, 1984
- Euconnus cazorlae Franz, 1957
- Euconnus cecchii Castellini, 2010
- Euconnus cederbergensis Franz, 1984
- Euconnus cederholmi Franz, 1982
- Euconnus celatus Sharp, 1887
- Euconnus celisi Cauchois, 1955
- Euconnus celisianus Franz, 1971
- Euconnus centralafricanus Franz, 1957
- Euconnus centralis (Franz, 1986)
- Euconnus centurionis (Schaufuss, L. W., 1889)
- Euconnus cephalonicus Karaman, 1973
- Euconnus cephalotes Franz, 1961
- Euconnus cephalotides Franz, 1962
- Euconnus cephalus Cauchois, 1955
- Euconnus cerastiventris Vít, 2006
- Euconnus cerviniformis Franz, 1962
- Euconnus cervinisimilis Franz, 1991
- Euconnus cervinus Franz, 1961
- Euconnus ceylonensis Franz, 1982
- Euconnus chaganus Franz, 1963
- Euconnus championi Sharp, 1887
- Euconnus charii Franz, 1963
- Euconnus charon Reitter, 1884
- Euconnus chaudhabiseanus Franz, 1974
- Euconnus chekiri Orousset, 2018
- Euconnus chevrolatii (Schaufuss, L. W., 1866)
- Euconnus chiangmaianus Franz, 1989
- Euconnus chiangmaii Franz, 1989
- Euconnus chiapasicola Franz, 1994
- Euconnus chimkhonanus Franz, 1979
- Euconnus chinensis Franz, 1985
- Euconnus chiriquensis Sharp, 1887
- Euconnus chisosus Stephan & O'Keefe, 2021
- Euconnus choctaw Stephan & O'Keefe, 2021
- Euconnus chrysocomus (Saulcy, 1864)
- Euconnus cienfuegosi Franz, 1991
- Euconnus cilifer Franz, 1986
- Euconnus cinnamomeus (Schaum, 1841)
- Euconnus circumlatus Franz, 1992
- Euconnus cirnelimai Franz, 1967
- Euconnus clanculus Reitter & Croissandeau, 1890
- Euconnus clarkei Franz, 1975
- Euconnus clarkianus Franz, 1975
- Euconnus clarus (Lea, 1915)
- Euconnus clavatriarticulata Franz, 1994
- Euconnus clavatus (LeConte, J. L., 1852)
- Euconnus clavicornis (Casey, 1897)
- Euconnus claviger (Müller, P. W. J. & Kunze, 1822)
- Euconnus clavigeroides Reitter, 1884
- Euconnus clavijoi Franz, 1989
- Euconnus clavipes (Say, 1824)
- Euconnus clientulus (Lea, 1910)
- Euconnus clinatus Cauchois, 1955
- Euconnus cocanus Franz, 1981
- Euconnus cochisei Stephan & Chandler, 2021
- Euconnus cockericola Franz, 1992
- Euconnus coiffaitianus Franz, 1985
- Euconnus colchicus Franz, 1986
- Euconnus collinus Franz, 1982
- Euconnus colomboanus Franz, 1982
- Euconnus coloniae Franz, 1989
- Euconnus columbianus Franz, 1980
- Euconnus columbicola Franz, 1993
- Euconnus comarapensis Franz, 1980
- Euconnus comatus Castellini, 2007
- Euconnus communis Stephan & O'Keefe, 2021
- Euconnus compactipennis Franz, 1979
- Euconnus compactulus Stephan & Chandler, 2021
- Euconnus compactus Franz, 1980
- Euconnus comparabilis Franz, 1980
- Euconnus comptus (Casey, 1897)
- Euconnus concavifrons Franz, 1962
- Euconnus conciliator Apfelbeck, 1906
- Euconnus concolor Stephan & O'Keefe, 2021
- Euconnus confertus Castellini, 2007
- Euconnus confinis Franz, 1986
- Euconnus conformides Newton, 2017
- Euconnus conformis Franz, 1984
- Euconnus conglobatus Franz, 1982
- Euconnus congoensis Lhoste, 1937
- Euconnus congolensis Franz, 1963
- Euconnus congruens Franz, 1980
- Euconnus coniceps Franz, 1967
- Euconnus conicicollis Franz, 1963
- Euconnus conicollis (Motschulsky, 1845)
- Euconnus conicus Reitter, 1882
- Euconnus conifer (Casey, 1897)
- Euconnus coniferarum Franz, 1971
- Euconnus conithorax Franz, 1983
- Euconnus conjunctus Franz, 1982
- Euconnus conoides Franz, 1989
- Euconnus conosoma Franz, 1982
- Euconnus consanguineus Franz, 1962
- Euconnus consimilis Franz, 1980
- Euconnus consobrinus (LeConte, J. L., 1852)
- Euconnus constanzanus Franz, 1991
- Euconnus constrictipenis Franz, 1962
- Euconnus constrictus Reitter & Croissandeau, 1890
- Euconnus contractus Reitter & Croissandeau, 1890
- Euconnus cooperi Lhoste, 1936
- Euconnus coralinus Reitter, 1883
- Euconnus corcicoensis Franz, 1980
- Euconnus corcicoi Franz, 1980
- Euconnus cordobanus Jałoszyński, 2020
- Euconnus cornipenis Franz, 1967
- Euconnus cornutor Csiki, 1919
- Euconnus coronatus Franz, 1980
- Euconnus corpulentus (Schaufuss, L. W., 1866)
- Euconnus corticis (King, 1864)
- Euconnus costatus Stephan & O'Keefe, 2021
- Euconnus cottarellii Castellini, 2007
- Euconnus cotticus Franz, 1972
- Euconnus coyahensis Franz, 1985
- Euconnus coyahi Franz, 1985
- Euconnus cradlei Franz, 1975
- Euconnus crasseclavatus Franz, 1962
- Euconnus crassicornis (Schaum, 1841)
- Euconnus crassides Newton, 2017
- Euconnus crassifemur Franz, 1986
- Euconnus crassus Franz, 1979
- Euconnus creber Castellini, 2007
- Euconnus crebrespinosus Franz, 1993
- Euconnus cribricollis (Schaufuss, L. W., 1889)
- Euconnus criniger Franz, 1979
- Euconnus crinitides Newton, 2017
- Euconnus crinitus Fauvel, 1889
- Euconnus cristicola Franz, 1986
- Euconnus cristobalensis Franz, 1994
- Euconnus croaticus Hlaváč & Stevanović, 2013
- Euconnus crockeranus Franz, 1992
- Euconnus crockeri Franz, 1992
- Euconnus cruentulus Reitter, 1887
- Euconnus crux Stephan & Chandler, 2021
- Euconnus cryptus Stephan & Chandler, 2021
- Euconnus cubaicola Franz, 1991
- Euconnus cubanus Franz, 1991
- Euconnus cuneipenis Franz, 1986
- Euconnus cuneipenisides Newton, 2017
- Euconnus curimaguai Franz, 1986
- Euconnus curtipilis Franz, 1962
- Euconnus curtus Castellini, 2007
- Euconnus curupaoi Franz, 1989
- Euconnus curvatitibia Franz, 1975
- Euconnus curvicrus Franz, 1975
- Euconnus curvipilis Franz, 1979
- Euconnus cuyaguanus Franz, 1988
- Euconnus cuzcoanus Franz, 1967
- Euconnus cuzcoi Franz, 1967
- Euconnus cyangugui Franz, 1985
- Euconnus cylindricollis Franz, 1977
- Euconnus cyrtocerus (Motschulsky, 1858)
- Euconnus cytoceriformis Franz, 1982
- Euconnus daburckhardtianus Jałoszyński, 2011
- Euconnus dade Stephan & O'Keefe, 2021
- Euconnus dambullanus Franz, 1982
- Euconnus damongoi Franz, 1984
- Euconnus daradanus Franz, 1975
- Euconnus darjeelingensis Franz, 1979
- Euconnus darungirii Franz, 1981
- Euconnus daulagirii Franz, 1981
- Euconnus dauphinensis Franz, 1986
- Euconnus daveyi (Lea, 1910)
- Euconnus daviesi Stephan & O'Keefe, 2021
- Euconnus debilis (Sharp, 1874)
- Euconnus decelleanus Franz, 1980
- Euconnus decellei Franz, 1980
- Euconnus decelleimimus Franz, 1984
- Euconnus decens Franz, 1961
- Euconnus decipiens (Casey, 1897)
- Euconnus decuanus Franz, 1988
- Euconnus deepaki Makhan, 1997
- Euconnus defectus Franz, 1977
- Euconnus delicatus Stephan & O'Keefe, 2021
- Euconnus delii Franz, 1963
- Euconnus delmastroi Castellini, 2006
- Euconnus deminuatus Davies, 2004
- Euconnus demirei Franz, 1962
- Euconnus demissus Reitter, 1887
- Euconnus demmeri Franz, 1963
- Euconnus deneensis Franz, 1980
- Euconnus densecrinitus Franz, 1971
- Euconnus densipilis Franz, 1962
- Euconnus dentatus Franz, 1991
- Euconnus denticornis (Müller, P. W. J. & Kunze, 1822)
- Euconnus dentifrons Stephan & O'Keefe, 2021
- Euconnus dentipennis Franz, 1961
- Euconnus dentiventris (Lea, 1915)
- Euconnus depigmentatus Franz, 1983
- Euconnus deprecator Kurbatov, 1993
- Euconnus depressifrons Franz, 1982
- Euconnus depressus Reitter & Croissandeau, 1890
- Euconnus derectus Franz, 1980
- Euconnus detectus Franz, 1980
- Euconnus devians Stephan & O'Keefe, 2021
- Euconnus dewnaraini Makhan, 1997
- Euconnus deyrupi Stephan & Chandler, 2021
- Euconnus dhlinzanus Franz, 1979
- Euconnus dhumpusensis Franz, 1981
- Euconnus diaboli Franz, 1967
- Euconnus dichelos Castellini, 2010
- Euconnus didyi Franz, 1986
- Euconnus diegoi Franz, 1986
- Euconnus diegosuarezi (Franz, 1986)
- Euconnus differens Franz, 1980
- Euconnus difficilis Sharp, 1887
- Euconnus dignus Franz, 1977
- Euconnus dilatus Stephan & O'Keefe, 2021
- Euconnus discedens Reitter, 1884
- Euconnus discifer Franz, 1980
- Euconnus discocephalus Franz, 1962
- Euconnus discolor Franz, 1980
- Euconnus dispar Franz, 1971
- Euconnus dissentus Stephan & Chandler, 2021
- Euconnus distans Sharp, 1887
- Euconnus distinctides Newton, 2017
- Euconnus distinguendus (Saulcy, 1870)
- Euconnus diversicornis Franz, 1979
- Euconnus divisus (Schwarz, 1878)
- Euconnus diyalumae Franz, 1982
- Euconnus diyalumaeformis Franz, 1982
- Euconnus diyalumanus Franz, 1982
- Euconnus djemensis Lhoste, 1936
- Euconnus dobereineri Franz, 1967
- Euconnus doddianus Franz, 1975
- Euconnus dodecanicus Franz, 1966
- Euconnus doesburgi Franz, 1983
- Euconnus dolalagathianus Franz, 1985
- Euconnus dolosus Reitter, 1883
- Euconnus domboshawanus Franz, 1979
- Euconnus domesticus Franz, 1982
- Euconnus dominicae Franz, 1991
- Euconnus dominicanus Franz, 1984
- Euconnus dominus Reitter, 1883
- Euconnus dondoanus Franz, 1979
- Euconnus donnybrookensides Newton, 2017
- Euconnus donnybrookensis Franz, 1975
- Euconnus dorotkanus Reitter, 1881
- Euconnus drakensbergensis Franz, 1979
- Euconnus dubiosus Franz, 1963
- Euconnus dufouri Orousset, 2015
- Euconnus dufourneti Franz, 1986
- Euconnus dufournetianus Franz, 1986
- Euconnus dukudukuensis Franz, 1979
- Euconnus dulcis Sharp, 1886
- Euconnus duplicatus (Lea, 1910)
- Euconnus dupliciseta Franz, 1994
- Euconnus durumtaliensis Franz, 1973
- Euconnus durumtalii Franz, 1973
- Euconnus dwarsbergeanus Franz, 1984
- Euconnus dwarsbergensis Franz, 1984
- Euconnus dwesaensis Franz, 1984
- Euconnus dwesanus Franz, 1984
- Euconnus dzibilchaltunensis Franz, 1994
- Euconnus eburneus Castellini, 2010
- Euconnus echinicollis Franz, 1973
- Euconnus ectatommae (Lea, 1910)
- Euconnus ecuadoreanus Franz, 1980
- Euconnus ecuatoreanus Franz, 1981
- Euconnus edeni Franz, 1984
- Euconnus edentipenis Franz, 1993
- Euconnus edmundi Csiki, 1919
- Euconnus edznanus Franz, 1994
- Euconnus efferus Franz, 1985
- Euconnus elandshoekensis Franz, 1979
- Euconnus elaphomorphus Castellini, 2010
- Euconnus elegans (Schaufuss, L. W., 1866)
- Euconnus elgonensis Franz, 1988
- Euconnus elineae Makhan, 1997
- Euconnus eliyae Franz, 1982
- Euconnus eliyanus Franz, 1982
- Euconnus eliyensis Franz, 1982
- Euconnus ellipsocephalus Franz, 1980
- Euconnus ellipticus (Schaufuss, L. W., 1866)
- Euconnus elliptipennis Franz, 1975
- Euconnus elsjeae Makhan, 1997
- Euconnus embaubanus Franz, 1983
- Euconnus embrapae Franz, 1983
- Euconnus eminens Franz, 1979
- Euconnus enderseni Franz, 1979
- Euconnus endrodyyounganus Franz, 1984
- Euconnus endroedyanus Franz, 1979
- Euconnus endroedyi Franz, 1979
- Euconnus endroedyyoungai Franz, 1979
- Euconnus enonensis (Péringuey, 1899)
- Euconnus eppelsheimi Croissandeau, 1893
- Euconnus eques Reitter & Croissandeau, 1890
- Euconnus eremita Franz, 1975
- Euconnus eremitides Newton, 2017
- Euconnus erinaceus Franz, 1971
- Euconnus ernsti Franz, 1963
- Euconnus escalerai Franz, 1961
- Euconnus eshowensis Franz, 1979
- Euconnus esperancae Franz, 1980
- Euconnus estebanus Franz, 1993
- Euconnus estrelanus Franz, 1967
- Euconnus estrellanus Franz, 1962
- Euconnus eumicriformis Reitter & Croissandeau, 1890
- Euconnus eumicroides Reitter, 1884
- Euconnus evanidus (Lea, 1915)
- Euconnus ewansis Franz, 1973
- Euconnus excavatifrons Franz, 1980
- Euconnus excavatus Sharp, 1887
- Euconnus excedens Reitter & Croissandeau, 1890
- Euconnus excelsipenis Franz, 1992
- Euconnus exilis Stephan & Chandler, 2021
- Euconnus eximius Franz, 1980
- Euconnus exoticus Stephan & Chandler, 2021
- Euconnus exploratus Franz, 1980
- Euconnus extensicornis (Motschulsky, 1863)
- Euconnus extinus Stephan & O'Keefe, 2021
- Euconnus exul Reitter & Croissandeau, 1890
- Euconnus fabresi Franz, 1971
- Euconnus fageli Franz, 1960
- Euconnus falcon Franz, 1989
- Euconnus falconensis Franz, 1989
- Euconnus falconius Franz, 1989
- Euconnus fallens Franz, 1971
- Euconnus familiaris Stephan & O'Keefe, 2021
- Euconnus fampanamboi (Franz, 1986)
- Euconnus fatuus (LeConte, J. L., 1852)
- Euconnus fauveli Croissandeau, 1893
- Euconnus favorabilis Reitter, 1884
- Euconnus februarius Jałoszyński, 2016
- Euconnus feeneyi Jałoszyński, 2015
- Euconnus felinus Reitter, 1883
- Euconnus feminus Franz, 1988
- Euconnus femoralis (Casey, 1897)
- Euconnus fenchihuensis Franz, 1985
- Euconnus fenchihui Franz, 1985
- Euconnus ferenczianus Franz, 1985
- Euconnus fereshtehe Makhan & Ezzatpanah, 2011
- Euconnus fernandoi Franz, 1961
- Euconnus ferrarii (Kiesenwetter, 1851)
- Euconnus fertilis Franz, 1980
- Euconnus ferus Franz, 1986
- Euconnus festivus (Schaufuss, L. W., 1866)
- Euconnus figuratoides Stephan & O'Keefe, 2021
- Euconnus figurator Stephan & O'Keefe, 2021
- Euconnus fijii Franz, 1971
- Euconnus filhoi Franz, 1967
- Euconnus filicornis Franz, 1962
- Euconnus filicorum Franz, 1971
- Euconnus filifer Franz, 1987
- Euconnus filipenis Franz, 1992
- Euconnus filitarsis (Casey, 1897)
- Euconnus filius Franz, 1982
- Euconnus fimbriatus (Lea, 1915)
- Euconnus fimbricollis (Lea, 1915)
- Euconnus fimetarius (Chaudoir, 1845)
- Euconnus fimidus Reitter & Croissandeau, 1890
- Euconnus fissipenis Franz, 1980
- Euconnus flavicornis Franz, 1962
- Euconnus flavidulus (Motschulsky, 1851)
- Euconnus flavipes (Lea, 1915)
- Euconnus flavitarsis (LeConte, J. L., 1852)
- Euconnus flavoapicalis (Lea, 1915)
- Euconnus flavus Franz, 1963
- Euconnus floralis Cauchois, 1955
- Euconnus floridanus Stephan & Chandler, 2021
- Euconnus fluctuans Franz, 1980
- Euconnus fluminis Franz, 1993
- Euconnus fontium Franz, 1992
- Euconnus forcipifer Franz, 1980
- Euconnus formalis (Casey, 1897)
- Euconnus formiciceps Vít, 2006
- Euconnus formosanus Reitter, 1913
- Euconnus foveatus Lhoste, 1936
- Euconnus foveiceps Franz, 1975
- Euconnus foveicollis Franz, 1963
- Euconnus foveidistans (Lea, 1915)
- Euconnus foveifrons Franz, 1962
- Euconnus foveithorax Franz, 1989
- Euconnus franklinensis (Lea, 1922)
- Euconnus franzensis Castellini, 2010
- Euconnus franzi Asenjo, 2016
- Euconnus fraudulentus Franz, 1980
- Euconnus frequens Franz, 1982
- Euconnus fricatoris (Schaufuss, L. W., 1889)
- Euconnus frontalis Sharp, 1887
- Euconnus fronticornis Franz, 1980
- Euconnus frontosus Csiki, 1919
- Euconnus frustus (Casey, 1897)
- Euconnus fukiensis Franz, 1985
- Euconnus fulgurans Franz, 1980
- Euconnus fullneri Franz, 1984
- Euconnus fulungi Franz, 1973
- Euconnus fulvipes Stephan & O'Keefe, 2021
- Euconnus fulvorufus Franz, 1980
- Euconnus fulvus (LeConte, J. L., 1852)
- Euconnus fundaebraccatus (Schaufuss, C., 1891)
- Euconnus funestides Newton, 2017
- Euconnus funestus Franz, 1963
- Euconnus furcatipenis Franz, 1984
- Euconnus furcatus (Schaufuss, L. W., 1884)
- Euconnus furcillipenis Franz, 1971
- Euconnus furcipenis Franz, 1982
- Euconnus furlani Franz, 1983
- Euconnus fuscipalpis (Lea, 1915)
- Euconnus fuscoflavus Franz, 1979
- Euconnus fuscus Franz, 1992
- Euconnus fustiger (Sharp, 1874)
- Euconnus gabonicola Franz, 1987
- Euconnus gagranicus Hlaváč & Stevanović, 2013
- Euconnus galaecianus Franz, 1957
- Euconnus galericulatus (Schaufuss, L. W., 1866)
- Euconnus galicianus Franz, 1989
- Euconnus galicus Franz, 1989
- Euconnus ganglbaueri Reitter, 1882
- Euconnus garavitanus Franz, 1967
- Euconnus garavitoi Franz, 1967
- Euconnus gardenofedeni Franz, 1984
- Euconnus gawleri Franz, 1975
- Euconnus gedensis Lhoste, 1939
- Euconnus geertsemai Franz, 1979
- Euconnus gentilis Franz, 1980
- Euconnus geomys Stephan & Chandler, 2021
- Euconnus germaniae Franz, 1993
- Euconnus germanus Sharp, 1887
- Euconnus gestroi (Schaufuss, L. W., 1884)
- Euconnus ghanae Franz, 1963
- Euconnus gharanus Franz, 1973
- Euconnus ghokarnae Franz, 1973
- Euconnus ghumensis Franz, 1979
- Euconnus gibbericornis Franz, 1982
- Euconnus gibbiodes Sharp, 1887
- Euconnus gibbium Reitter & Croissandeau, 1890
- Euconnus gigantocephalus Franz, 1963
- Euconnus gigas Franz, 1980
- Euconnus giraffa Sharp, 1887
- Euconnus gitangensis Franz, 1985
- Euconnus gitaraiae Makhan, 2010
- Euconnus glaber Franz, 1962
- Euconnus glabratus Franz, 1986
- Euconnus glabripennides Newton, 2017
- Euconnus glabripennis (Lea, 1910)
- Euconnus glandifer (Schaufuss, L. W., 1889)
- Euconnus glandulifer (Nietner, 1856)
- Euconnus glandulipenis Franz, 1992
- Euconnus globatus Castellini, 2007
- Euconnus globiceps Reitter, 1883
- Euconnus globicollis Franz, 1992
- Euconnus globipenis Franz, 1993
- Euconnus globoclavatus Franz, 1989
- Euconnus globosulus Franz, 1962
- Euconnus globosus Franz, 1961
- Euconnus globulicollis (Schaufuss, L. W., 1866)
- Euconnus globuliformis Franz, 1982
- Euconnus globulus Franz, 1982
- Euconnus gnavus Franz, 1980
- Euconnus gobanzi Reitter, 1899
- Euconnus godawarianus Franz, 1974
- Euconnus godawarii Franz, 1981
- Euconnus godwini Stephan & Chandler, 2021
- Euconnus goergeni Franz, 1983
- Euconnus goerzensis Reitter, 1894
- Euconnus goleanus Franz, 1981
- Euconnus gompaensis Franz, 1980
- Euconnus gomphocerus Franz, 1986
- Euconnus gomyanus Franz, 1986
- Euconnus gondwanensis Franz, 1980
- Euconnus goniaferens Castellini, 2010
- Euconnus gonitricus Castellini, 2007
- Euconnus gonjaensis Franz, 1984
- Euconnus goodrichi Stephan & Chandler, 2021
- Euconnus goropaniensis Franz, 1973
- Euconnus gouadeloupensis Franz, 1980
- Euconnus gracilicornis Sharp, 1887
- Euconnus gracilipalpis Franz, 1971
- Euconnus gracilipes Franz, 1962
- Euconnus gradatocephalus Franz, 1989
- Euconnus gradatus Stephan & Chandler, 2021
- Euconnus graminicola Franz, 1982
- Euconnus graminus Stephan & O'Keefe, 2021
- Euconnus grandaecomorae Franz, 1986
- Euconnus grandiclavis Reitter, 1907
- Euconnus grandicollis (Schaufuss, L. W., 1866)
- Euconnus grandiflex Stephan & Chandler, 2021
- Euconnus grandis (Motschulsky, 1851)
- Euconnus gratiosus Franz, 1980
- Euconnus gratus Casey, 1897
- Euconnus gravatus Csiki, 1919
- Euconnus gravidus (LeConte, J. L., 1852)
- Euconnus greensladei Franz, 1965
- Euconnus gressittensis Franz, 1975
- Euconnus griffithi (Lea, 1915)
- Euconnus grivaudi (Franz, 1986)
- Euconnus grootdrifensis Franz, 1984
- Euconnus grossus Stephan & O'Keefe, 2021
- Euconnus grouvellei Croissandeau, 1893
- Euconnus grylloides Franz, 1986
- Euconnus guadalcanalae Franz, 1965
- Euconnus guatemalae Franz, 1995
- Euconnus guatemalenus Sharp, 1887
- Euconnus guatemaltecus Franz, 1981
- Euconnus guayabitanus Franz, 1986
- Euconnus guayabitasensis Franz, 1986
- Euconnus guayarae Franz, 1980
- Euconnus guichardi Franz, 1958
- Euconnus guillebeaui Croissandeau, 1893
- Euconnus guineensis Franz, 1985
- Euconnus guinensis Franz, 1961
- Euconnus gulosus (King, 1864)
- Euconnus gumae Castellini, 1990
- Euconnus gundlachianus Franz, 1991
- Euconnus gundlachii (Schaufuss, L. W., 1866)
- Euconnus gurubathani Franz, 1981
- Euconnus gutzwilleri Franz, 1957
- Euconnus gwaliwenii Franz, 1979
- Euconnus haedillus Casey, 1897
- Euconnus haematicus (Fairmaire, 1860)
- Euconnus haematodes (Saulcy, 1870)
- Euconnus hakgalanus Franz, 1982
- Euconnus hakgalensis O'Keefe, 2000
- Euconnus hamatus Stephan & Chandler, 2021
- Euconnus hambantotanus Franz, 1983
- Euconnus hamus Stephan & O'Keefe, 2021
- Euconnus hanangi Franz, 1962
- Euconnus handenianus Franz, 1962
- Euconnus handenii Franz, 1962
- Euconnus haputalensis Franz, 1982
- Euconnus hardwarianus Franz, 1980
- Euconnus harkervillei Franz, 1984
- Euconnus harkervillensis Franz, 1984
- Euconnus harryi Makhan, 1997
- Euconnus hasalakae Franz, 1982
- Euconnus hasalakaensis Franz, 1982
- Euconnus hattoni Franz, 1982
- Euconnus hattonianus Franz, 1982
- Euconnus hawequasensis Franz, 1984
- Euconnus hawkeswoodi Makhan, 2005
- Euconnus hebes Castellini, 1982
- Euconnus heissi O'Keefe, 2000
- Euconnus heissianus Franz, 1985
- Euconnus helambuensis Franz, 1981
- Euconnus helderfonteini Franz, 1984
- Euconnus helenae Flach, C., 1891
- Euconnus hellmichi Franz, 1973
- Euconnus helpmekaari Franz, 1979
- Euconnus henrii Davies, 2004
- Euconnus hepingi Makhan, 2005
- Euconnus herberti Castellini, 2010
- Euconnus herzegovinensis Karaman, 1973
- Euconnus hesperus Stephan & O'Keefe, 2021
- Euconnus heterocera (Péringuey, 1899)
- Euconnus heterodecellei Franz, 1984
- Euconnus heteroprocerior Franz, 1984
- Euconnus hetschkoi Reitter & Croissandeau, 1890
- Euconnus heydeni (Saulcy, 1870)
- Euconnus hilaris Franz, 1971
- Euconnus hilum Castellini, 1982
- Euconnus himal Franz, 1985
- Euconnus himalayanus Franz, 1974
- Euconnus hirculus Sharp, 1887
- Euconnus hirsutus (Schaufuss, L. W., 1866)
- Euconnus hirtellus (LeConte, J. L., 1852)
- Euconnus hirticollis (Illiger, 1798)
- Euconnus hirtipes (Schaufuss, L. W., 1866)
- Euconnus hispanicus Franz, 1957
- Euconnus hispidus Stephan & O'Keefe, 2021
- Euconnus hitauranus Franz, 1974
- Euconnus hoanus Franz, 1984
- Euconnus hobarti Franz, 1975
- Euconnus hoelzeli Schweiger, 1958
- Euconnus hoi Franz, 1984
- Euconnus holdhausi Stolz, 1915
- Euconnus hoplites Sharp, 1887
- Euconnus horridides Newton, 2017
- Euconnus horridulus Franz, 1975
- Euconnus horridus Franz, 1975
- Euconnus horticola Franz, 1980
- Euconnus hortonensis Franz, 1982
- Euconnus hortonensoides Franz, 1982
- Euconnus hortonianus Franz, 1982
- Euconnus hospes (Saulcy, 1870)
- Euconnus howeanus Franz, 1975
- Euconnus huallagae Franz, 1980
- Euconnus hubbleanus Franz, 1975
- Euconnus hubblei Franz, 1975
- Euconnus huijbregtsi O'Keefe, 2000
- Euconnus humansdorpensis Franz, 1979
- Euconnus humeralis (Schaufuss, L. W., 1866)
- Euconnus humicola Franz, 1982
- Euconnus humidus Stephan & O'Keefe, 2021
- Euconnus humilior Franz, 1973
- Euconnus humilis (Casey, 1897)
- Euconnus humiphilus Franz, 1962
- Euconnus hummelincki Franz, 1985
- Euconnus hypertrophicus Franz, 1962
- Euconnus ibadani Franz, 1966
- Euconnus iconicus Reitter, 1907
- Euconnus idoneiformis Franz, 1994
- Euconnus igbohoanus Franz, 1987
- Euconnus igbohoi Franz, 1987
- Euconnus ignacii Franz, 1989
- Euconnus ignacionis Franz, 1993
- Euconnus ignobilis Franz, 1980
- Euconnus iguazuensis Franz, 1980
- Euconnus ikomensis Franz, 1977
- Euconnus ilamensis Franz, 1985
- Euconnus illawarrae Franz, 1975
- Euconnus illustris (Casey, 1897)
- Euconnus imaguncula Reitter, 1882
- Euconnus imitamentus Reitter, 1882
- Euconnus immunis Franz, 1980
- Euconnus impar Sharp, 1886
- Euconnus imparatus Reitter, 1882
- Euconnus impavidus (Lea, 1912)
- Euconnus imperfectus O'Keefe, 2000
- Euconnus impotens Casey, 1897
- Euconnus impressicollis Reitter, 1882
- Euconnus impressipennis Franz, 1975
- Euconnus inaequalis Stephan & O'Keefe, 2021
- Euconnus inanis Castellini, 2007
- Euconnus incerta (Schaufuss, L. W., 1889)
- Euconnus incerticornis (Lea, 1912)
- Euconnus incognitilankus Jałoszyński, 2011
- Euconnus incognitus Franz, 1975
- Euconnus incomparabilis Franz, 1980
- Euconnus incompletus Reitter & Croissandeau, 1890
- Euconnus incomptus Franz, 1983
- Euconnus inconspicuus Stephan & Chandler, 2021
- Euconnus incultus Sharp, 1887
- Euconnus indecorus Franz, 1992
- Euconnus indio Franz, 1994
- Euconnus indiorum Franz, 1994
- Euconnus indistinctus Franz, 1980
- Euconnus indochinensis Franz, 1975
- Euconnus indocilis Reitter, 1885
- Euconnus indutus Sharp, 1887
- Euconnus ineditus Franz, 1994
- Euconnus iners Reitter, 1907
- Euconnus inexpectus Stephan & Chandler, 2021
- Euconnus infinitissimus Lhoste, 1953
- Euconnus infirmus Csiki, 1919
- Euconnus inflatipennis Franz, 1960
- Euconnus inflatissimus Franz, 1975
- Euconnus inflatus Cauchois, 1955
- Euconnus ingenii Franz, 1980
- Euconnus inginiyagalae Franz, 1982
- Euconnus inginiyagalensis Franz, 1982
- Euconnus iniridae Franz, 1994
- Euconnus iniridanus Franz, 1994
- Euconnus inkachakanus Jałoszyński, 2018
- Euconnus innocuus (Casey, 1897)
- Euconnus innotabilis Franz, 1975
- Euconnus inopinus Franz, 1980
- Euconnus insculpticollis Castellini, 2010
- Euconnus insidiatus Franz, 1984
- Euconnus insigniventris (Lea, 1912)
- Euconnus insolitus Franz, 1984
- Euconnus instabilis Franz, 1980
- Euconnus instans Castellini, 1986
- Euconnus insulanides Newton, 2017
- Euconnus insulanus Franz, 1975
- Euconnus insularis Franz, 1961
- Euconnus insulicola Franz, 1970
- Euconnus integer Casey, 1897
- Euconnus interpositus Franz, 1986
- Euconnus intertropicalis Franz, 1962
- Euconnus inthanoni Franz, 1989
- Euconnus intrusus (Schaum, 1844)
- Euconnus iouzensis Hoshina & Nakata, 2018
- Euconnus isaloanus Franz, 1986
- Euconnus isaloensis Franz, 1986
- Euconnus ispartaensis Hlaváč & Stevanović, 2013
- Euconnus istambulicola Franz, 1997
- Euconnus istrianus Daffner, 1987
- Euconnus italicus Reitter, 1911
- Euconnus ivani Franz, 1989
- Euconnus ivanloebli Franz, 1980
- Euconnus ivelonae (Franz, 1986)
- Euconnus iviei Franz, 1990
- Euconnus ivondroi Franz, 1986
- Euconnus ixtacombae Franz, 1994
- Euconnus jacobsoni Blattný, C., 1935
- Euconnus jacurutanus Franz, 1980
- Euconnus jamaicaensis O'Keefe, 2000
- Euconnus janeiroi Franz, 1967
- Euconnus japonicus (Sharp, 1874)
- Euconnus jeanneli Lhoste, 1939
- Euconnus jeannelianus Franz, 1957
- Euconnus jeannioti Franz, 1971
- Euconnus jethoeae Makhan, 1997
- Euconnus jirianus Franz, 1971
- Euconnus jocheni Davies, 2004
- Euconnus johnensis Franz, 1991
- Euconnus johoreanus Franz, 1975
- Euconnus jordanensis Pic, 1900
- Euconnus jorgei Franz, 1983
- Euconnus juanguerrae Franz, 1980
- Euconnus kaboensis Franz, 1985
- Euconnus kabweensis Franz, 1981
- Euconnus kabwei Franz, 1981
- Euconnus kachongianus Franz, 1975
- Euconnus kaimanawae Franz, 1986
- Euconnus kalawanae Franz, 1982
- Euconnus kalikotensis Franz, 1973
- Euconnus kalimpongensis Franz, 1981
- Euconnus kalkanensis Davies & Vít, 2004
- Euconnus kambuius Castellini, 1990
- Euconnus kandyanus Franz, 1982
- Euconnus kandyensis Franz, 1982
- Euconnus kandyi Franz, 1982
- Euconnus kangarouanus Franz, 1975
- Euconnus kaoungai Franz, 1963
- Euconnus kaplidjun Vít, 1997
- Euconnus karabakhus Meybohm, 2019
- Euconnus karamanae Franz, 1980
- Euconnus karamani Reitter, 1896
- Euconnus karawarii Franz, 1993
- Euconnus kashmirensis Franz, 1979
- Euconnus kaszabi Franz, 1985
- Euconnus kathmanduensis Franz, 1973
- Euconnus katsinai Franz, 1987
- Euconnus kavacensis Franz, 1994
- Euconnus kegallae Franz, 1982
- Euconnus kelantanensis Franz, 1970
- Euconnus kenyae Franz, 1963
- Euconnus kenyanus Franz, 1963
- Euconnus kerkisicus Meybohm, 2017
- Euconnus kerpensis Meybohm, 2016
- Euconnus khaokhieoi Franz, 1989
- Euconnus khaosabapensis Franz, 1989
- Euconnus khaosabapi Franz, 1989
- Euconnus khaoyaianus Franz, 1989
- Euconnus khaoyaiensis Franz, 1989
- Euconnus khaoyaii Franz, 1989
- Euconnus kiboi Franz, 1963
- Euconnus kiesenwetteri (Kiesenwetter, 1851)
- Euconnus kikuyui Franz, 1963
- Euconnus kilimanjaroi Franz, 1963
- Euconnus kilimanus Franz, 1963
- Euconnus kinabaluanus Franz, 1992
- Euconnus kinabaluensis O'Keefe, 2000
- Euconnus kinabalui Franz, 1992
- Euconnus kinabalumontanus Franz, 1992
- Euconnus kindambaensis Franz, 1980
- Euconnus kingensis (Lea, 1912)
- Euconnus kiranae Makhan, 1997
- Euconnus kirkbyensis Franz, 1975
- Euconnus kirki Stephan & Chandler, 2021
- Euconnus kishii Franz, 1987
- Euconnus kiteleyi Stephan & Chandler, 2021
- Euconnus kivuensis Franz, 1971
- Euconnus klassenkopensis Franz, 1979
- Euconnus knysnana (Franz, 1979)
- Euconnus koelii Franz, 1994
- Euconnus koepkei Franz, 1967
- Euconnus koghii Franz, 1971
- Euconnus koghisensis Franz, 1986
- Euconnus kojiroi Hoshina, 2004
- Euconnus kolbei (Schaufuss, L. W., 1890)
- Euconnus kombanus Franz, 1986
- Euconnus koornhuisensis Franz, 1984
- Euconnus korthalii Franz, 1973
- Euconnus kosciuskoi Franz, 1975
- Euconnus koziorowiczi Croissandeau, 1893
- Euconnus kraatzianus Franz, 1993
- Euconnus kraatzii Reitter, 1882
- Euconnus kraussi Reitter, 1881
- Euconnus krugeri Franz, 1967
- Euconnus krugerianus Franz, 1979
- Euconnus kumejimensis Hoshina, 2013
- Euconnus kurseongensis Franz, 1979
- Euconnus kuruwitanus Franz, 1982
- Euconnus kwadasoanus Franz, 1984
- Euconnus kwadasoensis Franz, 1984
- Euconnus kwadasoi Franz, 1984
- Euconnus laborator (Schaufuss, L. W., 1889)
- Euconnus lacajaensis Franz, 1994
- Euconnus lacunosus (Casey, 1897)
- Euconnus laevicollis (Casey, 1897)
- Euconnus laevissimus (Motschulsky, 1851)
- Euconnus lagunillasi Franz, 1989
- Euconnus lalvarensis Iablokov-Khnzorian, 1964
- Euconnus lambomakandroi Franz, 1986
- Euconnus lamingtonensis Franz, 1994
- Euconnus lanceolatus Cauchois, 1955
- Euconnus lanchangensis Franz, 1992
- Euconnus langebergensis Franz, 1984
- Euconnus langebergi Franz, 1984
- Euconnus langei Reitter, 1885
- Euconnus langtangensis Franz, 1985
- Euconnus laniger Franz, 1962
- Euconnus lanuginosus Franz, 1961
- Euconnus lapazi Franz, 1993
- Euconnus largipennis Csiki, 1919
- Euconnus lasabejanus Franz, 1991
- Euconnus lasabejas O'Keefe, 2000
- Euconnus latebricola (Lea, 1915)
- Euconnus latelinguatus Franz, 1994
- Euconnus laticlava Franz, 1992
- Euconnus laticlavatus Franz, 1986
- Euconnus latior Cauchois, 1955
- Euconnus latipennis (Motschulsky, 1858)
- Euconnus latocephalus Cauchois, 1955
- Euconnus latus Franz, 1992
- Euconnus layanganus Franz, 1979
- Euconnus layangensis Franz, 1992
- Euconnus lazin Vít, 1997
- Euconnus leai Csiki, 1919
- Euconnus leanus Franz, 1975
- Euconnus lebongensis Franz, 1979
- Euconnus lebongianus Franz, 1979
- Euconnus lecontei (Schaufuss, L. W., 1866)
- Euconnus lederi Franz, 1957
- Euconnus leileri Franz, 1988
- Euconnus leilerianus Franz, 1990
- Euconnus leleupianus Franz, 1979
- Euconnus lenkoanus Franz, 1980
- Euconnus lenkoensis Franz, 1980
- Euconnus lenkoi Franz, 1980
- Euconnus lenthei Franz, 1983
- Euconnus leonhardi Reitter, 1905
- Euconnus lepidus Reitter & Croissandeau, 1890
- Euconnus lesnei Lhoste, 1936
- Euconnus leveillei Croissandeau, 1893
- Euconnus leviceps (Casey, 1897)
- Euconnus liberiae Lhoste, 1936
- Euconnus lifouensis Franz, 1979
- Euconnus lijingkei Franz, 1995
- Euconnus limiticola Franz, 1994
- Euconnus limitis Franz, 1980
- Euconnus lindemanni Franz, 1980
- Euconnus linderi (Saulcy, 1863)
- Euconnus lindeshofensis Franz, 1979
- Euconnus lindeshofianus Franz, 1979
- Euconnus lindneri Franz, 1963
- Euconnus linguatus Franz, 1994
- Euconnus linnavuorii Franz, 1987
- Euconnus liticola Franz, 1986
- Euconnus livagoensis Franz, 1992
- Euconnus ljubetensis Apfelbeck, 1918
- Euconnus loebli Franz, 1982
- Euconnus loeblianus Franz, 1982
- Euconnus loewii (Kiesenwetter, 1851)
- Euconnus loftyanus Franz, 1975
- Euconnus logonensis Franz, 1961
- Euconnus lombardus Daffner, 1986
- Euconnus lonecreekensis Franz, 1979
- Euconnus longatus Stephan & Chandler, 2021
- Euconnus longeacuminatus Franz, 1992
- Euconnus longeantennatus Franz, 1980
- Euconnus longeclavatus Franz, 1979
- Euconnus longesulcatus Franz, 1983
- Euconnus longiceps Fall, 1926
- Euconnus longicornis (Casey, 1897)
- Euconnus longilaminatus Meybohm, 2019
- Euconnus longinquus Franz, 1980
- Euconnus longior Franz, 1979
- Euconnus longipalpis (Schaufuss, L. W., 1866)
- Euconnus longipedes Hlaváč & Jalžić, 2009
- Euconnus longipes Franz, 1980
- Euconnus longipilis Reitter, 1883
- Euconnus longispinus Stephan & O'Keefe, 2021
- Euconnus longitubus Franz, 1982
- Euconnus longulus Halbherr, 1890
- Euconnus longus Franz, 1962
- Euconnus lorenti Franz, 1958
- Euconnus loretoi Franz, 1989
- Euconnus lothari Reitter & Croissandeau, 1890
- Euconnus lucai Castellini, 2010
- Euconnus luciae (Franz, 1984)
- Euconnus lucindalei Franz, 1975
- Euconnus lucindalensis Franz, 1975
- Euconnus luciphilus Franz, 1984
- Euconnus lucivagides Newton, 2017
- Euconnus lucivagus Franz, 1980
- Euconnus luculus Reitter, 1884
- Euconnus ludificans (Casey, 1897)
- Euconnus lughlanus Franz, 1979
- Euconnus luminosus Franz, 1989
- Euconnus lundgreni Stephan & Chandler, 2021
- Euconnus lupangae Franz, 1991
- Euconnus lupanganus Franz, 1991
- Euconnus luridus Stephan & O'Keefe, 2021
- Euconnus lusingae Franz, 1981
- Euconnus lynceus (Casey, 1897)
- Euconnus macarthuri Franz, 1975
- Euconnus macarthurides Newton, 2017
- Euconnus machadoensis Franz, 1979
- Euconnus macrocornis Lhoste, 1939
- Euconnus macrophthalmus Franz, 1962
- Euconnus macrops Franz, 1962
- Euconnus macrothorax Cauchois, 1955
- Euconnus maderensis Stephan & O'Keefe, 2021
- Euconnus madugodanus Franz, 1982
- Euconnus magister (LeConte, J. L., 1863)
- Euconnus magniceps Franz, 1962
- Euconnus magurae Franz, 1963
- Euconnus mahaoyai Franz, 1982
- Euconnus mahawelianus Franz, 1982
- Euconnus mahawelii Franz, 1982
- Euconnus mahunkai Franz, 1980
- Euconnus mahunkanus Franz, 1980
- Euconnus maipotonensis Franz, 1975
- Euconnus maipotonicus Franz, 1975
- Euconnus maipotonis Franz, 1975
- Euconnus makhani Franz, 1989
- Euconnus maklinii Mannerheim, 1844
- Euconnus malaysianus Franz, 1984
- Euconnus malumfashii Franz, 1987
- Euconnus mamoreanus Franz, 1980
- Euconnus manakambahinyi Franz, 1986
- Euconnus manangotryanus Franz, 1986
- Euconnus manaus O'Keefe, 2000
- Euconnus manausensis Franz, 1980
- Euconnus manciformis Franz, 1984
- Euconnus mancus Franz, 1980
- Euconnus mandrakanus (Franz, 1986)
- Euconnus mandrareanus Franz, 1986
- Euconnus manengoubae Franz, 1985
- Euconnus manengoubanus Franz, 1985
- Euconnus mangabensis Franz, 1986
- Euconnus manharii Franz, 1981
- Euconnus manianus Franz, 1980
- Euconnus manillae (Schaufuss, C., 1891)
- Euconnus manlii (Ravasini, 1923)
- Euconnus maracayanus Franz, 1988
- Euconnus maranguanus Franz, 1962
- Euconnus marangui Franz, 1962
- Euconnus marcuzzii Lhoste, 1953
- Euconnus mareanus Franz, 1979
- Euconnus mariepskopensis Franz, 1984
- Euconnus mariepskopi Franz, 1984
- Euconnus mariepskopianus Franz, 1984
- Euconnus mariepskopicus Franz, 1984
- Euconnus mariovi Karaman, 1973
- Euconnus maritzbushensis Franz, 1979
- Euconnus maroantsetrae Franz, 1986
- Euconnus maroantsetranus Franz, 1986
- Euconnus marojejyanus Franz, 1986
- Euconnus marojejyformis Franz, 1986
- Euconnus marojejyi Franz, 1986
- Euconnus marshalli Stephan & Chandler, 2021
- Euconnus martensianus Franz, 1971
- Euconnus martensis Franz, 1973
- Euconnus marthae Reitter, 1884
- Euconnus martini Franz, 1991
- Euconnus martiniensis Franz, 1991
- Euconnus marus Vít, 1999
- Euconnus maryvalensis Franz, 1975
- Euconnus masaii Franz, 1962
- Euconnus masculinus Franz, 1992
- Euconnus masculus Franz, 1980
- Euconnus masiaposae Franz, 1986
- Euconnus mastersi (Lea, 1915)
- Euconnus mastigiformis Franz, 1967
- Euconnus matae Franz, 1980
- Euconnus matsuae Hoshina, 2004
- Euconnus matsunoyamensis Hoshina & Nagano, 2005
- Euconnus mattogrossanus Franz, 1993
- Euconnus mau Franz, 1963
- Euconnus mauretanicus Franz, 1962
- Euconnus mauriformis Franz, 1980
- Euconnus mauritii Franz, 1972
- Euconnus maurus Franz, 1980
- Euconnus maya Jałoszyński, 2020
- Euconnus mayaimi Stephan & O'Keefe, 2021
- Euconnus mayanus Franz, 1994
- Euconnus medialis Sharp, 1887
- Euconnus megacephalus Franz, 1962
- Euconnus megamelas (Walker, 1859)
- Euconnus meghalayensis Franz, 1981
- Euconnus melindae Castellini, 2010
- Euconnus melkei Jałoszyński, 2022
- Euconnus merditanus Apfelbeck, 1907
- Euconnus meridae Franz, 1989
- Euconnus meridensis Franz, 1988
- Euconnus meridionalis Franz, 1967
- Euconnus meruanus Franz, 1963
- Euconnus merui Franz, 1962
- Euconnus merus Casey, 1897
- Euconnus metasternalis Lhoste, 1939
- Euconnus meteti Jałoszyński, 2017
- Euconnus mexicanorum Franz, 1994
- Euconnus mexicanus Franz, 1994
- Euconnus meyanus Franz, 1980
- Euconnus meybohmi Hlaváč & Stevanović, 2013
- Euconnus mgetae Franz, 1963
- Euconnus micans Franz, 1962
- Euconnus michaeli Franz, 1991
- Euconnus microalishanicus Franz, 1985
- Euconnus microcephalus Reitter, 1881
- Euconnus microcilipes Franz, 1986
- Euconnus microcollis Franz, 1975
- Euconnus microhortonensis Franz, 1982
- Euconnus microlaminatus Jałoszyński, 2015
- Euconnus microphthalmus Franz, 1962
- Euconnus microps (Lea, 1910)
- Euconnus micropterus Franz, 1993
- Euconnus micrus Lhoste, 1937
- Euconnus midongyi (Franz, 1986)
- Euconnus mihintalei Franz, 1982
- Euconnus milborgensis Franz, 1975
- Euconnus miles Holdhaus, 1923
- Euconnus milleri Franz, 1979
- Euconnus mimohortonensis Franz, 1982
- Euconnus minae Makhan & Ezzatpanah, 2011
- Euconnus minusculus Franz, 1984
- Euconnus minutipenis Franz, 1992
- Euconnus minutissimus Franz, 1984
- Euconnus minutulus Franz, 1989
- Euconnus minutus Franz, 1980
- Euconnus mirandillae Sharp, 1887
- Euconnus mirandus Sharp, 1887
- Euconnus mirificus Franz, 1989
- Euconnus mirus Franz, 1992
- Euconnus miser Franz, 1979
- Euconnus mississippicus Zimmermann, C., 1869
- Euconnus mitis Franz, 1980
- Euconnus mitratus Cauchois, 1955
- Euconnus miyatai Hoshina, 2019
- Euconnus moczarskii Holdhaus, 1908
- Euconnus moderatides Newton, 2017
- Euconnus moderatus Franz, 1971
- Euconnus mogulorum Franz, 1973
- Euconnus mohamedis Reitter, 1896
- Euconnus mohelii Franz, 1986
- Euconnus moleensis Franz, 1984
- Euconnus mombassae Franz, 1963
- Euconnus mombassanus Franz, 1963
- Euconnus monae Franz, 1980
- Euconnus monaragalanus Franz, 1982
- Euconnus monaragaliciformis Franz, 1982
- Euconnus monaragalicus Franz, 1982
- Euconnus mondulii Franz, 1963
- Euconnus moneoensis Franz, 1971
- Euconnus monstrosicornis Franz, 1980
- Euconnus monstruosoclavatus Franz, 1982
- Euconnus montanus Stephan & O'Keefe, 2021
- Euconnus montenegrinus Karaman, 1973
- Euconnus monteroensis Franz, 1980
- Euconnus monticola Franz, 1962
- Euconnus montisgaliciae Franz, 1986
- Euconnus moori Franz, 1963
- Euconnus moramangae Franz, 1986
- Euconnus moramangides Jałoszyński & Newton, 2020
- Euconnus moritzi Franz, 1980
- Euconnus moritzianus Franz, 1980
- Euconnus morongoroi Franz, 1985
- Euconnus motschulskii (Motschulsky, 1837)
- Euconnus mourgliai Castellini, 2010
- Euconnus mozambiquensis Franz, 1979
- Euconnus mucajaii Franz, 1994
- Euconnus mucajanus Franz, 1994
- Euconnus mucuyanus Franz, 1986
- Euconnus mucuyi Franz, 1986
- Euconnus mukanaensis Franz, 1981
- Euconnus mullaittivuanus O'Keefe, 2000
- Euconnus mullaittivuensis Franz, 1982
- Euconnus multispinosulus Jałoszyński & Newton, 2020
- Euconnus multispinosus Franz, 1979
- Euconnus mulullanus Franz, 1982
- Euconnus murunkanensis Franz, 1982
- Euconnus mussardianus Franz, 1982
- Euconnus mustangensis Franz, 1985
- Euconnus mutabilis Franz, 1982
- Euconnus mutandus Sharp, 1887
- Euconnus muticus Stephan & Chandler, 2021
- Euconnus muyeensis Franz, 1981
- Euconnus mwanihanae Franz, 1991
- Euconnus mwanihanensis Franz, 1991
- Euconnus nairobianus Franz, 1985
- Euconnus nairobiensis Franz, 1966
- Euconnus nairobii Franz, 1985
- Euconnus nakahamai Hoshina & Miyata, 2018
- Euconnus nakpandurii Franz, 1984
- Euconnus nalandae Lhoste, 1939
- Euconnus nambasanae Franz, 1986
- Euconnus namoiensis Franz, 1975
- Euconnus nanashi Hoshina, 2019
- Euconnus nandarivatuensis Franz, 1986
- Euconnus naniformis Franz, 1994
- Euconnus nanulus (Schaufuss, L. W., 1866)
- Euconnus napochiformis Franz, 1979
- Euconnus napochoides Cauchois, 1955
- Euconnus napochoidides Newton, 2017
- Euconnus napochoidiformis Franz, 1961
- Euconnus narentinus Apfelbeck, 1911
- Euconnus narrabriensis Franz, 1975
- Euconnus nasicornis Franz, 1967
- Euconnus natalensis Franz, 1984
- Euconnus nativus Franz, 1986
- Euconnus navaricus (Saulcy, 1870)
- Euconnus ndjilii Franz, 1961
- Euconnus nebulosus Reitter, 1885
- Euconnus nedunlenii Franz, 1982
- Euconnus nedunlenorium Franz, 1982
- Euconnus neglectus (King, 1864)
- Euconnus nelspruitensis Franz, 1979
- Euconnus neofrontalis Stephan & O'Keefe, 2021
- Euconnus neomexicanus Stephan & O'Keefe, 2021
- Euconnus neotrivialis Stephan & Chandler, 2021
- Euconnus nepos Franz, 1982
- Euconnus nepotulus Franz, 1982
- Euconnus neuraphiformis Reitter, 1907
- Euconnus newcastlensis Franz, 1975
- Euconnus newelli Franz, 1979
- Euconnus newellianus Franz, 1979
- Euconnus newtoni Franz, 1986
- Euconnus newtonianus Franz, 1986
- Euconnus ngoyanus Franz, 1987
- Euconnus nickerianus Franz, 1985
- Euconnus nickeriensis Franz, 1985
- Euconnus nietneri (Motschulsky, 1858)
- Euconnus nietnerianus Franz, 1982
- Euconnus nigeriae Franz, 1966
- Euconnus nigerianus Franz, 1966
- Euconnus nigerrimus Franz, 1984
- Euconnus nigrescens Casey, 1897
- Euconnus nigricans Franz, 1962
- Euconnus nigriceps Franz, 1975
- Euconnus nigrinus Franz, 1962
- Euconnus nigrofuscus Franz, 1980
- Euconnus nigropiceus Franz, 1975
- Euconnus nikitanus Reitter, 1881
- Euconnus nikitini Franz, 1975
- Euconnus nikitinianus Franz, 1975
- Euconnus nitens Franz, 1963
- Euconnus nitidiformis Franz, 1986
- Euconnus nitidus Franz, 1971
- Euconnus njegosi Karaman, 1973
- Euconnus nkwantai Franz, 1984
- Euconnus nkwantaiformis Franz, 1987
- Euconnus nkwantanus Franz, 1984
- Euconnus noctuabundus Franz, 1984
- Euconnus nocturnilankanus Jałoszyński, 2011
- Euconnus nocturnus Franz, 1958
- Euconnus nophrus Stephan & O'Keefe, 2021
- Euconnus northlandensis Franz, 1975
- Euconnus nosykombae Franz, 1986
- Euconnus noumeanus Franz, 1986
- Euconnus novaeteutoniae Franz, 1980
- Euconnus novellus (Casey, 1897)
- Euconnus novus Franz, 1986
- Euconnus nquaduanus Franz, 1984
- Euconnus nubigena Franz, 1980
- Euconnus nubivagus Franz, 1989
- Euconnus nudatus Franz, 1980
- Euconnus nudipennis Lhoste, 1939
- Euconnus numeae Franz, 1986
- Euconnus nuperus Kurbatov, 2006
- Euconnus nuwaranus Franz, 1982
- Euconnus nyakabuyeanus Franz, 1987
- Euconnus nyakabuyei Franz, 1985
- Euconnus nyerii Franz, 1963
- Euconnus oasis Franz, 1967
- Euconnus oaxacanides Jałoszyński, 2020
- Euconnus oaxacanus Franz, 1990
- Euconnus obanensis Franz, 1977
- Euconnus obesus Sharp, 1887
- Euconnus oblitus Franz, 1972
- Euconnus oblongiformis Franz, 1979
- Euconnus oblongus (Sturm, 1838)
- Euconnus obscurellus (LeConte, J. L., 1852)
- Euconnus obscuricornis (Lea, 1915)
- Euconnus obscuriformis Franz, 1962
- Euconnus obscurus Franz, 1962
- Euconnus obstipus Castellini, 1985
- Euconnus occidentalis Stephan & Chandler, 2021
- Euconnus occrae Castellini, 1990
- Euconnus occultus Casey, 1897
- Euconnus ocularides Newton, 2017
- Euconnus ocularis (Schaufuss, L. W., 1889)
- Euconnus oculus Stephan & O'Keefe, 2021
- Euconnus odaesanensis Hoshina & Sun-Jae Park, 2020
- Euconnus oedymerus Franz, 1986
- Euconnus ofinsoensis Franz, 1984
- Euconnus ofinsonicus Franz, 1984
- Euconnus ohenae Franz, 1980
- Euconnus oklahomensis Stephan & O'Keefe, 2021
- Euconnus okuanus Franz, 1985
- Euconnus okuensis Franz, 1985
- Euconnus oldonjoi Franz, 1966
- Euconnus olkokolae Franz, 1963
- Euconnus olkokolanus Franz, 1985
- Euconnus olokemeijii Franz, 1987
- Euconnus ombrophilus Franz, 1963
- Euconnus omninopunctatus Franz, 1980
- Euconnus onverdachtensis Franz, 1983
- Euconnus ophthalmicus Apfelbeck, 1911
- Euconnus opteralis Stephan & O'Keefe, 2021
- Euconnus oqalweniensis (Franz, 1979)
- Euconnus oqalwenii Franz, 1979
- Euconnus ordinatus Stephan & O'Keefe, 2021
- Euconnus oregonensis (Casey, 1897)
- Euconnus orellanae Franz, 1981
- Euconnus orientalis Lhoste, 1939
- Euconnus orinocoensis Franz, 1989
- Euconnus orinocoi Franz, 1989
- Euconnus orissensis Franz, 1979
- Euconnus ornatus Franz, 1979
- Euconnus orocopichei Franz, 1989
- Euconnus orstomensis Franz, 1980
- Euconnus oscillans Sharp, 1886
- Euconnus otini Peyerimhoff, 1949
- Euconnus ouachita Stephan & O'Keefe, 2021
- Euconnus ouremensis Franz, 1983
- Euconnus ouremi Franz, 1983
- Euconnus ouremicola Franz, 1983
- Euconnus outenikwai Franz, 1984
- Euconnus outenikwensis Franz, 1984
- Euconnus ovalis Stephan & O'Keefe, 2021
- Euconnus ovatus Franz, 1962
- Euconnus oviceps Franz, 1983
- Euconnus oviformis Franz, 1977
- Euconnus ovipennis Reitter & Croissandeau, 1890
- Euconnus ovulipenis Franz, 1992
- Euconnus oxlotanensis Franz, 1994
- Euconnus oxlotanus Franz, 1994
- Euconnus pachecoi Franz, 1967
- Euconnus pachyscelis Reitter & Croissandeau, 1890
- Euconnus paeneglaber Franz, 1992
- Euconnus paenenudus Franz, 1980
- Euconnus paenetypicus Franz, 1992
- Euconnus paenevisus Franz, 1991
- Euconnus palmicornis Cauchois, 1955
- Euconnus palmwoodensis Franz, 1975
- Euconnus palmwoodianus Franz, 1975
- Euconnus palpalis Sharp, 1887
- Euconnus palpator Castellini, 2007
- Euconnus paludicola Franz, 1980
- Euconnus pampeanus Franz, 1967
- Euconnus panamaensis Franz, 1980
- Euconnus panamensis Franz, 1993
- Euconnus pandellei (Fairmaire, 1859)
- Euconnus paniensis Franz, 1971
- Euconnus paraaguaceroi Franz, 1994
- Euconnus paraalishanicus Franz, 1985
- Euconnus paraanayaguanus Franz, 1988
- Euconnus parabalangodanus Franz, 1982
- Euconnus parabicornipenis Franz, 1984
- Euconnus parabiimpressus Franz, 1967
- Euconnus parabulbiceps Franz, 1989
- Euconnus paraburckhardti Franz, 1989
- Euconnus paracamponotorum Franz, 1980
- Euconnus paracaracasiensis Franz, 1986
- Euconnus paracelisi Franz, 1991
- Euconnus paracervinus Franz, 1977
- Euconnus paraceylonensis Franz, 1982
- Euconnus parachiangmaii Franz, 1989
- Euconnus parachiapasicola Franz, 1994
- Euconnus paracilipes Franz, 1986
- Euconnus paracolobopsis Franz, 1975
- Euconnus paracolomboanus Franz, 1982
- Euconnus paraconicollis Franz, 1983
- Euconnus paraconoides Franz, 1989
- Euconnus paracornipenis Franz, 1979
- Euconnus paracrinitus Franz, 1971
- Euconnus paracurvatitibia Franz, 1989
- Euconnus paradarjeelingensis Franz, 1981
- Euconnus paradecellei Franz, 1984
- Euconnus paradeneensis Franz, 1980
- Euconnus paradiyalumanus Franz, 1982
- Euconnus paradoxus Stephan & Chandler, 2021
- Euconnus paraechinicollis Franz, 1980
- Euconnus paraensis Franz, 1983
- Euconnus parafemoralis Stephan & Chandler, 2021
- Euconnus parafissipenis Franz, 1980
- Euconnus parafricatoris Franz, 1985
- Euconnus parafurcatipenis Franz, 1984
- Euconnus paraglabripennis Franz, 1975
- Euconnus paraglobicollis Franz, 1992
- Euconnus paragratiosus Franz, 1980
- Euconnus paragrivaudi (Franz, 1986)
- Euconnus paraguatemalenus Franz, 1995
- Euconnus paraguayanus Franz, 1980
- Euconnus paragulosus Franz, 1975
- Euconnus parahasalakaensis Franz, 1982
- Euconnus parahortonensis Franz, 1982
- Euconnus paraidoneiformis Franz, 1994
- Euconnus paraindicus Franz, 1973
- Euconnus parainginiyagalae Franz, 1982
- Euconnus parainsulicola Franz, 1970
- Euconnus parakashmirensis Franz, 1980
- Euconnus parakelantanensis Franz, 1985
- Euconnus parakinabalui Franz, 1992
- Euconnus parakinabalumontanus Franz, 1992
- Euconnus parakingensis Franz, 1975
- Euconnus paraklassenkopensis Franz, 1984
- Euconnus paralangebergi Franz, 1984
- Euconnus parallelocollis Franz, 1984
- Euconnus parallelus Stephan & O'Keefe, 2021
- Euconnus paramacrothorax Franz, 1971
- Euconnus paramancus Franz, 1980
- Euconnus paramaracayanus O'Keefe, 2000
- Euconnus paramartensianus Franz, 1985
- Euconnus paramassaii Franz, 1985
- Euconnus paramattensis (King, 1864)
- Euconnus paramerorum Franz, 1992
- Euconnus paramirus Franz, 1992
- Euconnus paramonaragalanus Franz, 1982
- Euconnus paramozambiquensis Franz, 1979
- Euconnus paramussardianus Franz, 1982
- Euconnus paranaibanus Franz, 1980
- Euconnus paranamensis Franz, 1983
- Euconnus paranapochoides Franz, 1982
- Euconnus paranasicornis Franz, 1979
- Euconnus paranatalensis Franz, 1984
- Euconnus paranidicola Franz, 1993
- Euconnus paranitidus Franz, 1971
- Euconnus parankwantanus Franz, 1984
- Euconnus paraoblongiformis Franz, 1984
- Euconnus parapahangensis Franz, 1992
- Euconnus parapilicollis Franz, 1982
- Euconnus parapiripenis Franz, 1991
- Euconnus paraprocerior Franz, 1984
- Euconnus paraquinquefoveolatus Franz, 1982
- Euconnus pararhododendri Franz, 1973
- Euconnus pararobustus Franz, 1975
- Euconnus parasabianus Franz, 1979
- Euconnus parasalinasiensis Franz, 1988
- Euconnus parasamaraccanus Franz, 1989
- Euconnus parasamaruanus Franz, 1984
- Euconnus parasetosipenis Franz, 1984
- Euconnus parashanusii Franz, 1980
- Euconnus parashikanus Franz, 1982
- Euconnus paratalatouyae Franz, 1982
- Euconnus paratarapotae Franz, 1980
- Euconnus paratestaceus Franz, 1991
- Euconnus parathailandensis Franz, 1975
- Euconnus paratovarianus Franz, 1989
- Euconnus paratridentipenis Franz, 1994
- Euconnus paratuxtlae Franz, 1994
- Euconnus parausitatus Franz, 1975
- Euconnus parcespinosus Franz, 1993
- Euconnus parcus (Casey, 1897)
- Euconnus pardii Castellini, 2010
- Euconnus pardus Franz, 1962
- Euconnus parilis Franz, 1986
- Euconnus parnassi Karaman, 1973
- Euconnus parviceps Franz, 1985
- Euconnus parvipenis Franz, 1962
- Euconnus parvus Cauchois, 1955
- Euconnus passaquatroi Franz, 1993
- Euconnus patens (Schaufuss, L. W., 1866)
- Euconnus patrizii Castellini, 2007
- Euconnus paucespinosus Franz, 1993
- Euconnus paucipilosus Franz, 1962
- Euconnus pauliani Franz, 1986
- Euconnus paulianides Jałoszyński & Newton, 2020
- Euconnus paulinus Franz, 1980
- Euconnus pauper Reitter & Croissandeau, 1890
- Euconnus pauxillus Franz, 1979
- Euconnus pavanensis Franz, 1985
- Euconnus pavidus Franz, 1980
- Euconnus pavionis Schweiger, 1961
- Euconnus pecki Stephan & Chandler, 2021
- Euconnus peckianus Franz, 1986
- Euconnus peckiensis Franz, 1986
- Euconnus peckorum Franz, 1986
- Euconnus peculiaris Stephan & O'Keefe, 2021
- Euconnus pedemontanus Stolz, 1927
- Euconnus pedernalesi Franz, 1991
- Euconnus peezi Franz, 1967
- Euconnus peezianus Franz, 1967
- Euconnus pellitus Franz, 1973
- Euconnus pembertonensis Franz, 1975
- Euconnus penangianus Franz, 1975
- Euconnus penangpaeninsularis Jałoszyński, 2011
- Euconnus penicillifer Franz, 1994
- Euconnus peninsularis Stephan & Chandler, 2021
- Euconnus peradeniyae Franz, 1982
- Euconnus peradeniyensis Franz, 1982
- Euconnus perbrincki Franz, 1982
- Euconnus peregriniformis Franz, 1986
- Euconnus peregrinus Franz, 1986
- Euconnus perfunestus Franz, 1980
- Euconnus pergentilis Franz, 1980
- Euconnus perineti Franz, 1986
- Euconnus perinetides Jałoszyński & Newton, 2020
- Euconnus perisi Franz, 1957
- Euconnus peristeri Karaman, 1973
- Euconnus periyapullumalaianus Franz, 1982
- Euconnus perlucidus Franz, 1979
- Euconnus permixtus Reitter & Croissandeau, 1890
- Euconnus permodicus Reitter & Croissandeau, 1890
- Euconnus permutans Franz, 1982
- Euconnus perotensis Franz, 1994
- Euconnus perplexus Franz, 1986
- Euconnus perrieri Franz, 1986
- Euconnus perrierides Jałoszyński & Newton, 2020
- Euconnus persimilis Csiki, 1919
- Euconnus perspectus Franz, 1982
- Euconnus pertinax (Casey, 1897)
- Euconnus peruanus Franz, 1967
- Euconnus peyrierasi Franz, 1986
- Euconnus pharaonis (Motschulsky, 1851)
- Euconnus phetchaburianus Franz, 1989
- Euconnus phewanus Franz, 1981
- Euconnus philipsi Franz, 1991
- Euconnus photophilus Franz, 1966
- Euconnus phulchokianus Franz, 1973
- Euconnus phulchokii Franz, 1973
- Euconnus phuntsholingi Franz, 1975
- Euconnus piauiensis Franz, 1983
- Euconnus picescens Franz, 1980
- Euconnus picicollis (Broun, 1880)
- Euconnus pictoris (Schaufuss, L. W., 1884)
- Euconnus pictus Stephan & O'Keefe, 2021
- Euconnus pidurutalagalanus Franz, 1982
- Euconnus pietersburgensis Franz, 1979
- Euconnus piggensis Franz, 1979
- Euconnus pilicollis (Motschulsky, 1851)
- Euconnus pilifer (Schaufuss, L. W., 1866)
- Euconnus pilosiceps Franz, 1962
- Euconnus pilosicepsides Newton, 2017
- Euconnus pilosipennis Franz, 1980
- Euconnus pilosissimus Franz, 1980
- Euconnus pilosus Cauchois, 1955
- Euconnus pimensis Stephan & Chandler, 2021
- Euconnus pinguiculus Reitter & Croissandeau, 1890
- Euconnus pini Franz, 1971
- Euconnus piripeniformis Franz, 1982
- Euconnus piripennis Cauchois, 1955
- Euconnus pisoniae Franz, 1975
- Euconnus placidus Franz, 1980
- Euconnus planifrons Franz, 1963
- Euconnus planipennis Franz, 1979
- Euconnus planocephalus Cauchois, 1955
- Euconnus planus Franz, 1975
- Euconnus platyceps Franz, 1962
- Euconnus plaumanni Franz, 1980
- Euconnus plaumannianus Franz, 1980
- Euconnus plaumannioloides Jałoszyński, 2017
- Euconnus plicatulus (Schaufuss, L. W., 1866)
- Euconnus plitvicensis (Machulka, 1928)
- Euconnus poarimicola Franz, 1971
- Euconnus pocsi Franz, 1985
- Euconnus podocarpi Franz, 1980
- Euconnus pogonatus Castellini, 2010
- Euconnus politus (Say, 1827)
- Euconnus polonnaruwae Franz, 1982
- Euconnus polonnaruwanus Franz, 1982
- Euconnus pondoki Franz, 1992
- Euconnus populus Stephan & O'Keefe, 2021
- Euconnus poringensis Franz, 1992
- Euconnus porrectus Castellini, 2007
- Euconnus portalis Stephan & Chandler, 2021
- Euconnus portochuelensis Franz, 1988
- Euconnus portochueloi Franz, 1988
- Euconnus potreroi Franz, 1967
- Euconnus pragensis (Machulka, 1923)
- Euconnus pravus Reitter, 1884
- Euconnus primaensis Franz, 1986
- Euconnus primavesii Franz, 1967
- Euconnus principulus (Schaufuss, L. W., 1887)
- Euconnus privus Franz, 1977
- Euconnus problematicus Franz, 1973
- Euconnus procerior Franz, 1984
- Euconnus proceriorisimilis Franz, 1984
- Euconnus proceripes Franz, 1979
- Euconnus procerrimus Franz, 1983
- Euconnus procerus (Casey, 1897)
- Euconnus prolixus Reitter, 1885
- Euconnus promontorii Franz, 1967
- Euconnus promptus (Coquerel, 1860)
- Euconnus proparus Stephan & Chandler, 2021
- Euconnus protectus Franz, 1989
- Euconnus providus Reitter & Croissandeau, 1890
- Euconnus proximus (Casey, 1897)
- Euconnus pseudanophthalmus Cauchois, 1955
- Euconnus pseudobalangodanus Franz, 1982
- Euconnus pseudobingervilleanus Franz, 1984
- Euconnus pseudocaecus Cauchois, 1955
- Euconnus pseudocaledonicus Franz, 1986
- Euconnus pseudocampanaeformis Franz, 1994
- Euconnus pseudocavacensis Franz, 1993
- Euconnus pseudoceylonensis Franz, 1982
- Euconnus pseudoclaculus Franz, 1993
- Euconnus pseudodistinguendus Franz, 1986
- Euconnus pseudoeliyensis Franz, 1982
- Euconnus pseudoenderseni Franz, 1979
- Euconnus pseudofestivus Franz, 1989
- Euconnus pseudofurcipenis Franz, 1982
- Euconnus pseudolongulus Schweiger, 1961
- Euconnus pseudonitidus Franz, 1986
- Euconnus pseudonkwantanus Franz, 1984
- Euconnus pseudonuwaranus Franz, 1982
- Euconnus pseudoperegrinus Franz, 1986
- Euconnus pseudoperineti (Franz, 1986)
- Euconnus pseudoperspectus Franz, 1982
- Euconnus pseudoplanocephalus Franz, 1971
- Euconnus pseudopycnophus Franz, 1994
- Euconnus pseudoramsayi Franz, 1975
- Euconnus pseudosabiensis Franz, 1984
- Euconnus pseudoshikanus Franz, 1982
- Euconnus pseudosukhotanus Franz, 1992
- Euconnus pseudotestaceus Franz, 1991
- Euconnus pubescens (Nietner, 1856)
- Euconnus pubicollis (Müller, P. W. J. & Kunze, 1822)
- Euconnus pubifer Sharp, 1887
- Euconnus puerilis Cauchois, 1955
- Euconnus puertoricoanus Franz, 1991
- Euconnus puertoricoensis Franz, 1991
- Euconnus pulcher Reitter, 1884
- Euconnus puliyanensis Franz, 1982
- Euconnus pullatus Reitter, 1882
- Euconnus pullipenis Franz, 1994
- Euconnus pullus Franz, 1963
- Euconnus punctatissimides Newton, 2017
- Euconnus punctatissimus Franz, 1973
- Euconnus punctatocephalus Cauchois, 1955
- Euconnus punctatus Franz, 1962
- Euconnus puncticollis Sharp, 1887
- Euconnus punctiger Franz, 1980
- Euconnus punctipennis Franz, 1980
- Euconnus pungweanus Franz, 1979
- Euconnus puniceus Reitter, 1882
- Euconnus puracensis Franz, 1986
- Euconnus pusillimus Franz, 1984
- Euconnus pustulatus (Schaufuss, L. W., 1866)
- Euconnus putus Casey, 1897
- Euconnus pygmaeides Newton, 2017
- Euconnus pygmaeus (Nietner, 1856)
- Euconnus pygmoides Franz, 1963
- Euconnus pyramidalis (LeConte, J. L., 1863)
- Euconnus pyrenaeus Xambeu, 1889
- Euconnus quadrarius Castellini, 2007
- Euconnus quadrifoveolatus (Schaufuss, L. W., 1889)
- Euconnus quadrus Stephan & Chandler, 2021
- Euconnus quatroirmanoensis Franz, 1994
- Euconnus quebradae Franz, 1989
- Euconnus queenslandensis Franz, 1975
- Euconnus quercatus Stephan & O'Keefe, 2021
- Euconnus quercavus Stephan & Chandler, 2021
- Euconnus querceti Franz, 1994
- Euconnus quicumque Cauchois, 1955
- Euconnus quillabambae Franz, 1967
- Euconnus quillabambanus Franz, 1967
- Euconnus quinquefoveatus Cauchois, 1955
- Euconnus quinquefoveolatus Motschulsky, 1863
- Euconnus quinqueimpressus Reitter, 1882
- Euconnus quinquepunctatus Reitter, 1882
- Euconnus quiquearticulatus Franz, 1992
- Euconnus rakotonoelyanus Franz, 1986
- Euconnus rakotonoelyi Franz, 1986
- Euconnus rambukkanensis Franz, 1982
- Euconnus ramfisensis Franz, 1984
- Euconnus ramparathi Makhan, 1997
- Euconnus ramsayi Franz, 1975
- Euconnus ranchoensis O'Keefe, 2000
- Euconnus ranchograndeanus Franz, 1988
- Euconnus ranchograndei Franz, 1989
- Euconnus ranchograndensis O'Keefe, 2000
- Euconnus ranchoi Franz, 1988
- Euconnus ranchoicola Franz, 1989
- Euconnus raptiensis Franz, 1974
- Euconnus raranus Franz, 1974
- Euconnus rariclava Lhoste, 1939
- Euconnus rarus Franz, 1982
- Euconnus rasus (LeConte, J. L., 1852)
- Euconnus ratnapuranus Franz, 1982
- Euconnus rattanae Makhan, 1997
- Euconnus raucus Sharp, 1886
- Euconnus recidivus Franz, 1980
- Euconnus reconditides Newton, 2017
- Euconnus reconditus Franz, 1979
- Euconnus rectus Franz, 1982
- Euconnus reductipenis Franz, 1971
- Euconnus refertus (Schaufuss, L. W., 1889)
- Euconnus refugus Franz, 1980
- Euconnus regimbarti Croissandeau, 1893
- Euconnus regularis Cauchois, 1955
- Euconnus reichi Franz, 1980
- Euconnus reichianus Franz, 1980
- Euconnus reitteri Saulcy, 1878
- Euconnus relucens Casey, 1897
- Euconnus remanens Franz, 1977
- Euconnus remiformis Stephan & Chandler, 2021
- Euconnus rendondus Franz, 1982
- Euconnus renosterpoorti Franz, 1979
- Euconnus repletulus Stephan & O'Keefe, 2021
- Euconnus repletus (Casey, 1897)
- Euconnus repugnans (Casey, 1897)
- Euconnus retinax Castellini, 2007
- Euconnus retractus Franz, 1980
- Euconnus retroflexus Stephan & Chandler, 2021
- Euconnus rhinoceroides Cauchois, 1955
- Euconnus rhinoceros Cauchois, 1955
- Euconnus rhodensis Franz, 1966
- Euconnus rhodesiensis Franz, 1979
- Euconnus rhododendri Franz, 1973
- Euconnus rhombiceps Franz, 1975
- Euconnus rhombicepsides Newton, 2017
- Euconnus rhombocartianus Jałoszyński, 2017
- Euconnus rhomboimitator Jałoszyński, 2017
- Euconnus rhombomiramaranus Jałoszyński, 2017
- Euconnus rhombopanamensis Jałoszyński, 2017
- Euconnus rileyi Stephan & Chandler, 2021
- Euconnus riobenianus Franz, 1993
- Euconnus riobenii Franz, 1993
- Euconnus riobrancoi Franz, 1980
- Euconnus rionapoi Franz, 1981
- Euconnus rionegroi Franz, 1980
- Euconnus riongii Franz, 1963
- Euconnus riparius Franz, 1982
- Euconnus ripicola Franz, 1980
- Euconnus ripiphilus Franz, 1980
- Euconnus rishi Makhan, 1997
- Euconnus rishwani Makhan, 1997
- Euconnus rivularis (Lea, 1915)
- Euconnus robinsoni (Franz, 1986)
- Euconnus robinsonianus Franz, 1986
- Euconnus robisoni Stephan & Chandler, 2021
- Euconnus robusticeps Franz, 1992
- Euconnus robustus Reitter, 1882
- Euconnus roepi Makhan, 2006
- Euconnus roepnaraini Makhan, 1997
- Euconnus rossianus Castellini, 2010
- Euconnus rossii Castellini, 1985
- Euconnus rotundipenis Franz, 1993
- Euconnus rougemonti Franz, 1982
- Euconnus rousi Franz, 1975
- Euconnus roussettensis Franz, 1986
- Euconnus rubens Stephan & Chandler, 2021
- Euconnus rubiginosus (Schaufuss, L. W., 1889)
- Euconnus rubroferrugineus Franz, 1985
- Euconnus rubropardus Franz, 1963
- Euconnus rudati Franz, 1983
- Euconnus rudebecki Franz, 1967
- Euconnus rudianus Winkler, A., 1911
- Euconnus rudimentalis Jałoszyński, 2019
- Euconnus rudimentarius Franz, 1982
- Euconnus rufescens (Motschulsky, 1851)
- Euconnus ruficollis Franz, 1980
- Euconnus rufidus Stephan & O'Keefe, 2021
- Euconnus rufobrunneus Franz, 1980
- Euconnus rufus Franz, 1980
- Euconnus rugiceps Franz, 1980
- Euconnus rugosus Franz, 1979
- Euconnus rupestris Franz, 1979
- Euconnus rutilipennis (Müller, P. W. J. & Kunze, 1822)
- Euconnus rwandanus Franz, 1987
- Euconnus ryvkini Kurbatov, 2006
- Euconnus sabahanus Franz, 1992
- Euconnus sabahensis (Franz, 1992)
- Euconnus sabahi Franz, 1992
- Euconnus sabahinanus Franz, 1992
- Euconnus sabianus Franz, 1979
- Euconnus sabiensis Franz, 1979
- Euconnus sagittifer Franz, 1994
- Euconnus saheliensis Franz, 1963
- Euconnus saintlucianus Franz, 1984
- Euconnus sakaeratensis Franz, 1975
- Euconnus sakaerati Franz, 1975
- Euconnus sakarahae Franz, 1986
- Euconnus sakarahaeformis Franz, 1986
- Euconnus salinasi Franz, 1989
- Euconnus salinasianus Franz, 1988
- Euconnus salinator (LeConte, J. L., 1852)
- Euconnus salisburyanus Franz, 1979
- Euconnus salvadorensis Franz, 1993
- Euconnus salvettii Franz, 1972
- Euconnus samarensis Franz, 1986
- Euconnus samaruanus Franz, 1984
- Euconnus sambavae (Franz, 1986)
- Euconnus samharaeus Reitter, 1882
- Euconnus samiriae Franz, 1989
- Euconnus samirianus Franz, 1989
- Euconnus samius Meybohm, 2017
- Euconnus sampaianus Franz, 1980
- Euconnus sanctuarii Franz, 1982
- Euconnus sandsi Franz, 1966
- Euconnus sangouiniensis Franz, 1980
- Euconnus sanjeanus Franz, 1991
- Euconnus sanjeensis Franz, 1991
- Euconnus sanjei Franz, 1991
- Euconnus sanjoseensis Franz, 1994
- Euconnus sanjuani Franz, 1961
- Euconnus sanluisi Franz, 1986
- Euconnus santacruzensis Franz, 1980
- Euconnus santaecatharinae Franz, 1980
- Euconnus santamariae Franz, 1967
- Euconnus santanderanus Franz, 1986
- Euconnus santiagoensis Franz, 1994
- Euconnus sapobae Franz, 1977
- Euconnus sapobanus Franz, 1977
- Euconnus saramaccanus Franz, 1985
- Euconnus sassandraensis Franz, 1980
- Euconnus sastriensis Franz, 1983
- Euconnus satishanandi Makhan, 1997
- Euconnus satishi Makhan, 1997
- Euconnus saulcyanus (Croissandeau, 1893)
- Euconnus saulcyi (Croissandeau, 1891)
- Euconnus sauteri Reitter, 1913
- Euconnus sauterianus Franz, 1985
- Euconnus saxicola Franz, 1971
- Euconnus sayaka Hoshina, 2019
- Euconnus sayo Hoshina, 2020
- Euconnus scharffi Franz, 1991
- Euconnus scharffianus Franz, 1991
- Euconnus schaufussensis Franz, 1994
- Euconnus schaufussi Csiki, 1919
- Euconnus schaufussianus Franz, 1970
- Euconnus schawalleri Franz, 1980
- Euconnus schenklingi Reitter, 1913
- Euconnus schenklingianus Csiki, 1919
- Euconnus schieferi Stephan & O'Keefe, 2021
- Euconnus schiodtei (Kiesenwetter, 1851)
- Euconnus schlosseri Reitter, 1880
- Euconnus schmidianus Franz, 1971
- Euconnus schmidtianus Franz, 1994
- Euconnus schmiedeli Franz, 1963
- Euconnus scipio Reitter, 1900
- Euconnus scobina Castellini, 2010
- Euconnus sconditus Franz, 1980
- Euconnus scotti Lhoste, 1936
- Euconnus scrupulosus Franz, 1980
- Euconnus sculpticollis Franz, 1979
- Euconnus scydmaeniformis Franz, 1963
- Euconnus scydmaenilliformis Franz, 1975
- Euconnus scydmaenoides Franz, 1967
- Euconnus sebastiani Franz, 1984
- Euconnus seboendrodyi Franz, 1984
- Euconnus secessus Franz, 1977
- Euconnus secundarius Franz, 1983
- Euconnus securiformis Stephan & O'Keefe, 2021
- Euconnus sedlaceki Franz, 1975
- Euconnus segnis Sharp, 1887
- Euconnus segregatus Franz, 1980
- Euconnus selindae Franz, 1979
- Euconnus selindanus Franz, 1979
- Euconnus semicoecus Franz, 1980
- Euconnus semiglaber Franz, 1962
- Euconnus semiinsculptus Franz, 1979
- Euconnus seminiger (Lea, 1915)
- Euconnus seminudides Newton, 2017
- Euconnus seminudus (Schaufuss, L. W., 1884)
- Euconnus semipilosus Franz, 1961
- Euconnus semipunctatus Franz, 1967
- Euconnus semirarus Stephan & Chandler, 2021
- Euconnus semiruber Casey, 1897
- Euconnus senegalensis Franz, 1966
- Euconnus senex Scott, 1922
- Euconnus separandus Franz, 1980
- Euconnus separatus Stephan & Chandler, 2021
- Euconnus septemdecim Castellini, 2007
- Euconnus sericeus Stephan & Chandler, 2021
- Euconnus seseanus Franz, 1984
- Euconnus setayeshe Makhan & Ezzatpanah, 2011
- Euconnus setiger (Casey, 1897)
- Euconnus setiphallus Jałoszyński, 2015
- Euconnus setosipenis Franz, 1984
- Euconnus sexfoveatus Lhoste, 1939
- Euconnus sexhamatus Franz, 1994
- Euconnus seychellensis Scott, 1922
- Euconnus sforziae Castellini, 2010
- Euconnus shagunuanus Franz, 1977
- Euconnus shanusii Franz, 1980
- Euconnus shermathangensis Franz, 1981
- Euconnus shikanus Franz, 1973
- Euconnus shresthai Franz, 1981
- Euconnus shutjeanus Franz, 1979
- Euconnus siamensis Franz, 1989
- Euconnus siberiae Franz, 1980
- Euconnus siberianus Franz, 1980
- Euconnus sibitianus Franz, 1980
- Euconnus sibitiensis Franz, 1980
- Euconnus sibitii Franz, 1980
- Euconnus sibylleae Franz, 1984
- Euconnus sibylleanus Franz, 1984
- Euconnus sica Castellini, 2007
- Euconnus sierrae Franz, 1988
- Euconnus sierraecostalis Franz, 1994
- Euconnus sierraepacificae Franz, 1994
- Euconnus sierranus Franz, 1988
- Euconnus siguirii Franz, 1985
- Euconnus silauensis Franz, 1992
- Euconnus silvaemontanae Franz, 1994
- Euconnus silvaenubladae Franz, 1989
- Euconnus silvafortunensis Jałoszyński, 2017
- Euconnus silvanus Castellini, 2010
- Euconnus silvicola Franz, 1962
- Euconnus similis (Weise, J., 1875)
- Euconnus simillimides Newton, 2017
- Euconnus simillimus Franz, 1986
- Euconnus simoni Reitter, 1880
- Euconnus simonianus Franz, 1957
- Euconnus simplex Stephan & Chandler, 2021
- Euconnus simplicitus (Schaufuss, L. W., 1866)
- Euconnus simulatorides Newton, 2017
- Euconnus singalanensis (Schaufuss, L. W., 1884)
- Euconnus singularis Franz, 1980
- Euconnus sinuositubus Franz, 1982
- Euconnus skeldingi Franz, 1980
- Euconnus skelleyi Stephan & Chandler, 2021
- Euconnus skukuzae Franz, 1979
- Euconnus smetanaensis Franz, 1992
- Euconnus smetanai Franz, 1992
- Euconnus snodgrassi Stephan & O'Keefe, 2021
- Euconnus soalalae Franz, 1986
- Euconnus soandranensis Franz, 1986
- Euconnus socialis Franz, 1977
- Euconnus socotranus Hlaváč, 2012
- Euconnus soekhnandanae Makhan, 1997
- Euconnus soesilae Makhan, 1997
- Euconnus sogai (Franz, 1986)
- Euconnus soledadensis Franz, 1991
- Euconnus solitarius Sharp, 1887
- Euconnus solomonorum Franz, 1965
- Euconnus solus Stephan & O'Keefe, 2021
- Euconnus sommeijeri Makhan, 1997
- Euconnus sommeri Franz, 1979
- Euconnus sosia Castellini, 2010
- Euconnus soutpansbergensis (Franz, 1979)
- Euconnus spatulus Reitter & Croissandeau, 1890
- Euconnus spectator Franz, 1961
- Euconnus spectatoriformis Franz, 1963
- Euconnus spectatorius Franz, 1962
- Euconnus specula Castellini, 2010
- Euconnus specusus Vít, 2004
- Euconnus sphaericeps Franz, 1993
- Euconnus sphaerocephalides Newton, 2017
- Euconnus spinicoxus Stephan & O'Keefe, 2021
- Euconnus spinitarsis Franz, 1970
- Euconnus spinitex Stephan & O'Keefe, 2021
- Euconnus spiniventris Franz, 1975
- Euconnus spinosus Franz, 1985
- Euconnus spiriculus Stephan & Chandler, 2021
- Euconnus spissicornis (Coquerel, 1860)
- Euconnus springbokensis Franz, 1984
- Euconnus springboki Franz, 1984
- Euconnus srilankanus Franz, 1982
- Euconnus stachi Franz, 1957
- Euconnus stanwellensis Franz, 1975
- Euconnus stephani Chandler & Newton, 2021
- Euconnus stewartensis Franz, 1980
- Euconnus stolbergensis Franz, 1983
- Euconnus stolbergianus Franz, 1983
- Euconnus stoltzei Franz, 1991
- Euconnus stoltzianus Franz, 1991
- Euconnus stormsriveri (Franz, 1979)
- Euconnus strangulatus Cauchois, 1955
- Euconnus stuporis Reitter, 1882
- Euconnus sturanyi Ganglbauer, 1899
- Euconnus stylifer Franz, 1992
- Euconnus stylobus Stephan & O'Keefe, 2021
- Euconnus styriacus (Grimmer, 1841)
- Euconnus suarezi (Franz, 1986)
- Euconnus subangulatus Stephan & Chandler, 2021
- Euconnus subclavatus Sharp, 1887
- Euconnus subcompressus Reitter & Croissandeau, 1890
- Euconnus subdivisus Reitter, 1882
- Euconnus subglabripennis (Lea, 1915)
- Euconnus subimpressus (Schaufuss, L. W., 1866)
- Euconnus submontanus Franz, 1994
- Euconnus subniger Castellini, 2010
- Euconnus subplicata (Schaufuss, L. W., 1889)
- Euconnus subterraneus Reitter, 1881
- Euconnus subtilides Newton, 2017
- Euconnus subtropicus Stephan & Chandler, 2021
- Euconnus suburbanus Franz, 1994
- Euconnus sukhotanus Franz, 1985
- Euconnus sumatranus Franz, 1984
- Euconnus surinamensis Franz, 1980
- Euconnus surinami Franz, 1983
- Euconnus surinamicus Franz, 1983
- Euconnus suspiciosus Franz, 1980
- Euconnus suteri Stephan & Chandler, 2021
- Euconnus suthepensis Franz, 1989
- Euconnus suturalis (Schaufuss, L. W., 1866)
- Euconnus swartriveri Franz, 1979
- Euconnus swellendamensis Franz, 1984
- Euconnus swellendami Franz, 1984
- Euconnus swierstrai Franz, 1979
- Euconnus sylvaticus Stephan & Chandler, 2021
- Euconnus syriacus Croissandeau, 1898
- Euconnus szunyoghyi Franz, 1985
- Euconnus taitii Castellini, 2010
- Euconnus taiwanicus Franz, 1985
- Euconnus taiwanus Franz, 1985
- Euconnus takachihoi Hoshina, 2015
- Euconnus talatuoyae Franz, 1982
- Euconnus talatuoyanus Franz, 1982
- Euconnus tamatavensis Franz, 1986
- Euconnus tamborinensis Franz, 1975
- Euconnus tamborini Franz, 1975
- Euconnus tampokezanus Franz, 1986
- Euconnus tanalae Franz, 1986
- Euconnus tanalanus (Franz, 1986)
- Euconnus tananus Franz, 1986
- Euconnus tandarakotensis Franz, 1973
- Euconnus tanganyikae Franz, 1962
- Euconnus tantillus Reitter, 1883
- Euconnus tantulus Franz, 1957
- Euconnus tanzaniae Franz, 1991
- Euconnus tanzanicola Franz, 1991
- Euconnus tarapotae Franz, 1980
- Euconnus tarapotanus Franz, 1980
- Euconnus tarsalis Stephan & Chandler, 2021
- Euconnus tavushus Meybohm, 2019
- Euconnus teapae Franz, 1994
- Euconnus teapanus Franz, 1994
- Euconnus tectus Franz, 1980
- Euconnus tehama Chandler, 2021
- Euconnus telangensis Reitter, 1884
- Euconnus telluris Franz, 1982
- Euconnus teloxus Stephan & Chandler, 2021
- Euconnus temporalis Castellini, 2007
- Euconnus tenebrosus (Casey, 1897)
- Euconnus tenuicollis (Lea, 1915)
- Euconnus tenuicornides Newton, 2017
- Euconnus tenuides Newton, 2017
- Euconnus tenuis (Lea, 1915)
- Euconnus tenuissimus Franz, 1982
- Euconnus teodoroi Franz, 1980
- Euconnus teportlanus Franz, 1994
- Euconnus tepuyanus Franz, 1994
- Euconnus teresianapolisi Franz, 1993
- Euconnus terminatus (Schaufuss, L. W., 1866)
- Euconnus termitophilus Wasmann, 1902
- Euconnus terraefirmae Franz, 1983
- Euconnus terrenus Franz, 1973
- Euconnus terricola Lhoste, 1939
- Euconnus testaceipes (Casey, 1897)
- Euconnus testaceus (Schaum, 1841)
- Euconnus teteforteanus Franz, 1986
- Euconnus teteforti Franz, 1986
- Euconnus tetrameliformis Franz, 1994
- Euconnus tetramelisimilis Franz, 1993
- Euconnus tetrameloides Franz, 1962
- Euconnus tetratoma Reitter, 1883
- Euconnus texanus Stephan & Chandler, 2021
- Euconnus thai Franz, 1975
- Euconnus thaianus Franz, 1989
- Euconnus thailandensis Franz, 1975
- Euconnus theraiensis Franz, 1974
- Euconnus thermophilus Franz, 1993
- Euconnus thodungensis Franz, 1981
- Euconnus thomayi Reitter, 1880
- Euconnus thompsonianus Franz, 1975
- Euconnus thoraceinornatus Blattný, C., 1935
- Euconnus threekingensis Franz, 1975
- Euconnus tijucae Franz, 1967
- Euconnus timahanus Franz, 1970
- Euconnus timahi Franz, 1975
- Euconnus timstruyvei Jałoszyński, 2017
- Euconnus tindouanus Franz, 1971
- Euconnus tindouensis Franz, 1971
- Euconnus tindoui Franz, 1971
- Euconnus tiwaiensis Castellini, 1990
- Euconnus tombeanus Franz, 1972
- Euconnus tongoboryi Franz, 1986
- Euconnus tonkouiensis Franz, 1980
- Euconnus tonnierianus Franz, 1971
- Euconnus tonsus Franz, 1982
- Euconnus topalianus Franz, 1979
- Euconnus torimanus Reitter, 1907
- Euconnus torquatus Sharp, 1887
- Euconnus torreya Stephan & O'Keefe, 2021
- Euconnus tortipenis Franz, 1975
- Euconnus tortricornides Newton, 2017
- Euconnus tortricornis Franz, 1980
- Euconnus tortritubus Franz, 1982
- Euconnus toscanus Franz, 1966
- Euconnus touko Hoshina, 2019
- Euconnus tovarensis Franz, 1988
- Euconnus tovarianus Franz, 1988
- Euconnus tovaricola Franz, 1993
- Euconnus townbushensis Franz, 1979
- Euconnus traegardhi Franz, 1967
- Euconnus traegardhianus Franz, 1967
- Euconnus traegardhides Jałoszyński & Newton, 2020
- Euconnus tranoroanides Newton, 2017
- Euconnus tranoroanus Franz, 1986
- Euconnus transatlanticus Franz, 1989
- Euconnus transgrediens Franz, 1980
- Euconnus transkeiana (Franz, 1984)
- Euconnus transkeiensis Franz, 1984
- Euconnus transpacificus Franz, 1971
- Euconnus transparens Franz, 1971
- Euconnus transsylvanicus Saulcy, 1877
- Euconnus transvaalensis Franz, 1979
- Euconnus transvaalicus Franz, 1984
- Euconnus transverselineatus Franz, 1980
- Euconnus transversicephalus Franz, 1980
- Euconnus transversicornis (Motschulsky, 1863)
- Euconnus trapezicollis Franz, 1986
- Euconnus trapichitei Franz, 1988
- Euconnus triangularis Cauchois, 1955
- Euconnus trianguliceps Franz, 1980
- Euconnus triarticuli Lhoste, 1939
- Euconnus tricapucinus Franz, 1970
- Euconnus trichocerus (Motschulsky, 1851)
- Euconnus tridentatus (Lea, 1915)
- Euconnus tridentipennis Franz, 1994
- Euconnus trifidus (Casey, 1897)
- Euconnus trifossulatus Lhoste, 1939
- Euconnus trifoveatus (Schaufuss, L. W., 1866)
- Euconnus trigeminus (Schaufuss, L. W., 1866)
- Euconnus trigonicus Castellini, 2007
- Euconnus trinidadensis Franz, 1990
- Euconnus trinifer (Casey, 1897)
- Euconnus trinodus (Motschulsky, 1858)
- Euconnus trispinosus Franz, 1963
- Euconnus tristis Franz, 1979
- Euconnus trivialis (Casey, 1897)
- Euconnus tronqueti Orousset, 2014
- Euconnus tropicalis Franz, 1979
- Euconnus tropicus Franz, 1957
- Euconnus trujilloi Franz, 1988
- Euconnus truncatus Stephan & Chandler, 2021
- Euconnus truncorum Franz, 1980
- Euconnus tschadensis Franz, 1958
- Euconnus tschadianus Franz, 1963
- Euconnus tsitsikamanus Franz, 1979
- Euconnus tsugaruensis Hoshina & S. Arai, 2003
- Euconnus tuberculifrons Franz, 1983
- Euconnus tuberculisternus Stephan & O'Keefe, 2021
- Euconnus tubericornis Franz, 1982
- Euconnus tuberifer Franz, 1971
- Euconnus tucson Stephan & O'Keefe, 2021
- Euconnus tumuli Franz, 1986
- Euconnus tuonglinhensis Franz, 1983
- Euconnus turgidiformis Franz, 1973
- Euconnus turgidissimus Franz, 1974
- Euconnus turgidiventris Franz, 1973
- Euconnus turgidus Franz, 1971
- Euconnus turnbowi Stephan & O'Keefe, 2021
- Euconnus tuxtlae Franz, 1994
- Euconnus tuxtlanus Franz, 1994
- Euconnus twelloensis Franz, 1979
- Euconnus typicus Franz, 1980
- Euconnus ubahanus Franz, 1992
- Euconnus ugandae Franz, 1963
- Euconnus ugandianus Franz, 1963
- Euconnus ugolinii Castellini, 2010
- Euconnus ulcifrons Franz, 1973
- Euconnus uluguranus Franz, 1963
- Euconnus ulugurui Franz, 1962
- Euconnus umgenii (Franz, 1979)
- Euconnus ummahiensis Franz, 1977
- Euconnus ummaliae Franz, 1977
- Euconnus uncus Castellini, 1985
- Euconnus undiquepilosus Franz, 1980
- Euconnus unicolor Stephan & Chandler, 2021
- Euconnus unicornis Cauchois, 1955
- Euconnus unidentatus Stephan & Chandler, 2021
- Euconnus universitarius Franz, 1989
- Euconnus universitatis Franz, 1989
- Euconnus unpini Hoshina, 2007
- Euconnus upembae Franz, 1981
- Euconnus upembanus Franz, 1981
- Euconnus urbanus Franz, 1982
- Euconnus ursinus Franz, 1970
- Euconnus uruguayanus Franz, 1967
- Euconnus usae Franz, 1985
- Euconnus usanus Franz, 1985
- Euconnus usitatus (Lea, 1915)
- Euconnus ussuriensis Kurbatov, 1988
- Euconnus uvanus Franz, 1982
- Euconnus uzungwai Franz, 1991
- Euconnus uzungwanus Franz, 1991
- Euconnus vacillaris Davies, 2004
- Euconnus vadoni Franz, 1986
- Euconnus vadonianus Franz, 1986
- Euconnus vadonides Jałoszyński & Newton, 2020
- Euconnus valdeabnormis Franz, 1993
- Euconnus valdeincurvatus Franz, 1994
- Euconnus valdeindutus Franz, 1980
- Euconnus valdeobscurus Franz, 1992
- Euconnus valdepilosides Newton, 2017
- Euconnus valdepilosus Franz, 1979
- Euconnus valdespinosus Franz, 1993
- Euconnus valdetransparens Franz, 1994
- Euconnus validicornis (Schaum, 1841)
- Euconnus validiformis (Franz, 1986)
- Euconnus validus (Schaufuss, C., 1890)
- Euconnus vanuensis Franz, 1986
- Euconnus varaeblancae Franz, 1994
- Euconnus vareschii Franz, 1989
- Euconnus variabilis Stephan & Chandler, 2021
- Euconnus varicornis Casey, 1897
- Euconnus vaucheri Franz, 1989
- Euconnus velebiticus Müller, G., 1924
- Euconnus venatus Franz, 1971
- Euconnus venezuelensis Lhoste, 1953
- Euconnus ventralis Casey, 1897
- Euconnus ventrecarinatus Franz, 1980
- Euconnus ventriculosus Franz, 1992
- Euconnus verhoeki Franz, 1985
- Euconnus versicolor Stephan & Chandler, 2021
- Euconnus versutiformis Franz, 1982
- Euconnus versutus Franz, 1982
- Euconnus vertexalis Li, Qi-Qi & Zi-Wei Yin, 2021
- Euconnus verticemicans Franz, 1984
- Euconnus verticillatus Franz, 1963
- Euconnus verus Franz, 1982
- Euconnus vestitus Reitter & Croissandeau, 1890
- Euconnus viator Peyerimhoff, 1917
- Euconnus vicinus Karaman, 1973
- Euconnus victoriae Franz, 1963
- Euconnus viduus Franz, 1971
- Euconnus vietnamensis Franz, 1983
- Euconnus vignai Castellini, 2007
- Euconnus villosus (Motschulsky, 1851)
- Euconnus vinctus Stephan & Chandler, 2021
- Euconnus vinkeanus Franz, 1986
- Euconnus vinkei Franz, 1986
- Euconnus virilis Franz, 1994
- Euconnus visezi Franz, 1957
- Euconnus vitripenis Franz, 1982
- Euconnus vittatus (Schaufuss, L. W., 1889)
- Euconnus vividus Sharp, 1887
- Euconnus volatilis Franz, 1984
- Euconnus voltaensis Franz, 1984
- Euconnus wairauensis Franz, 1986
- Euconnus walkeri (Lea, 1915)
- Euconnus walteri Castellini, 2010
- Euconnus walterrossii Castellini, 2010
- Euconnus wani Makhan, 1997
- Euconnus waratahensis Franz, 1975
- Euconnus warensis Franz, 1975
- Euconnus wari Jałoszyński, 2018
- Euconnus warratahanus Franz, 1975
- Euconnus warwickianus Franz, 1975
- Euconnus waterhousei (Pic, 1894)
- Euconnus watsoni Franz, 1980
- Euconnus wellawayae Franz, 1982
- Euconnus wellawayanus Franz, 1982
- Euconnus weragamtotae Franz, 1982
- Euconnus werneri Stephan & O'Keefe, 2021
- Euconnus westminsterianus Franz, 1982
- Euconnus wetterhallii (Gyllenhal, 1813)
- Euconnus weyrauchi Franz, 1967
- Euconnus wickhami Stephan & O'Keefe, 2021
- Euconnus wilfridi Franz, 1971
- Euconnus williamsi Franz, 1971
- Euconnus wilsoni Franz, 1975
- Euconnus wimbushi Franz, 1975
- Euconnus windischgraetzi Franz, 1963
- Euconnus winneguthi Apfelbeck, 1907
- Euconnus witteanus Franz, 1981
- Euconnus wittei Franz, 1981
- Euconnus wittmeri Franz, 1979
- Euconnus wittmerianus Franz, 1979
- Euconnus woodbushensis Franz, 1979
- Euconnus woodi Franz, 1975
- Euconnus woodleyi Franz, 1963
- Euconnus xumenii Franz, 1979
- Euconnus yadhaigana Jałoszyński, 2015
- Euconnus yangambii Franz, 1957
- Euconnus yoshidai Hoshina, 2020
- Euconnus yucatani Franz, 1994
- Euconnus zakrius Meybohm, 2019
- Euconnus zanzianus Franz, 1980
- Euconnus zanzibaricus (Schaufuss, L. W., 1884)
- Euconnus zanziicola Franz, 1980
- Euconnus zerchei Franz, 1994
- Euconnus zikanensis Franz, 1993
- Euconnus zimmermani Franz, 1971
- Euconnus zoiai Castellini, 2007
- Euconnus zoiaides Jałoszyński & Newton, 2020
- Euconnus zonatus Stephan & Chandler, 2021
- Euconnus zorumi Franz, 1973
- Euconnus zoufali Vít, 1999
- † Euconnus fossilis Franz, 1976
- † Euconnus liedtkei Franz, 1976
- † Euconnus nathani Jałoszyński & Perkovsky, 2021
- † Euconnus palaeogenus Jałoszyński & Perkovsky, 2016
- † Euconnus siculus Fiori, 1932
- † Euconnus sucini Franz, 1976
- † Euconnus wunderlichi Franz, 1983
