= Gastroserica gemellata =

Scientific classification
- Kingdom: Animalia
- Phylum: Arthropoda
- Class: Insecta
- Order: Coleoptera
- Suborder: Polyphaga
- Infraorder: Scarabaeiformia
- Family: Scarabaeidae
- Genus: Gastroserica
- Species: G. gemellata

Binomial name
- Gastroserica gemellata Ahrens & Pacholátko, 2007

Species of beetle

Gastroserica gemellata is a species of beetle of the family Scarabaeidae. It is found in Myanmar.

== Description ==
Adults reach a length of about 6.8-7.5 mm. They have a yellowish-brown, oblong body. The frons, antennal club, elytral margins and even intervals, as well as two symmetrical spots on the pronotal disc are all dark brown. The dorsal surface is dull, with metallic green dark spots and moderately dense erect setae mixed with dense and short setae.

== Etymology ==
The species name is derived from Latin gemellatus (meaning doubled or twin-like) and refers to its similarity with Gastroserica patkaiensis.
