= Gastroserica higonia =

Scientific classification
- Kingdom: Animalia
- Phylum: Arthropoda
- Class: Insecta
- Order: Coleoptera
- Suborder: Polyphaga
- Infraorder: Scarabaeiformia
- Family: Scarabaeidae
- Genus: Gastroserica
- Species: G. higonia

Binomial name
- Gastroserica higonia (Lewis, 1895)

Synonyms
- Serica higonia Lewis, 1895

Species of beetle

Gastroserica higonia is a species of beetle of the family Scarabaeidae. It is found in Japan.

== Description ==
Adults reach a length of about 6-6.5 mm. Adults closely resemble Gastroserica brevicornis, but the head is less robust, the thorax is more convex on the disc. The antennae are pale at the base, with the club dark.
