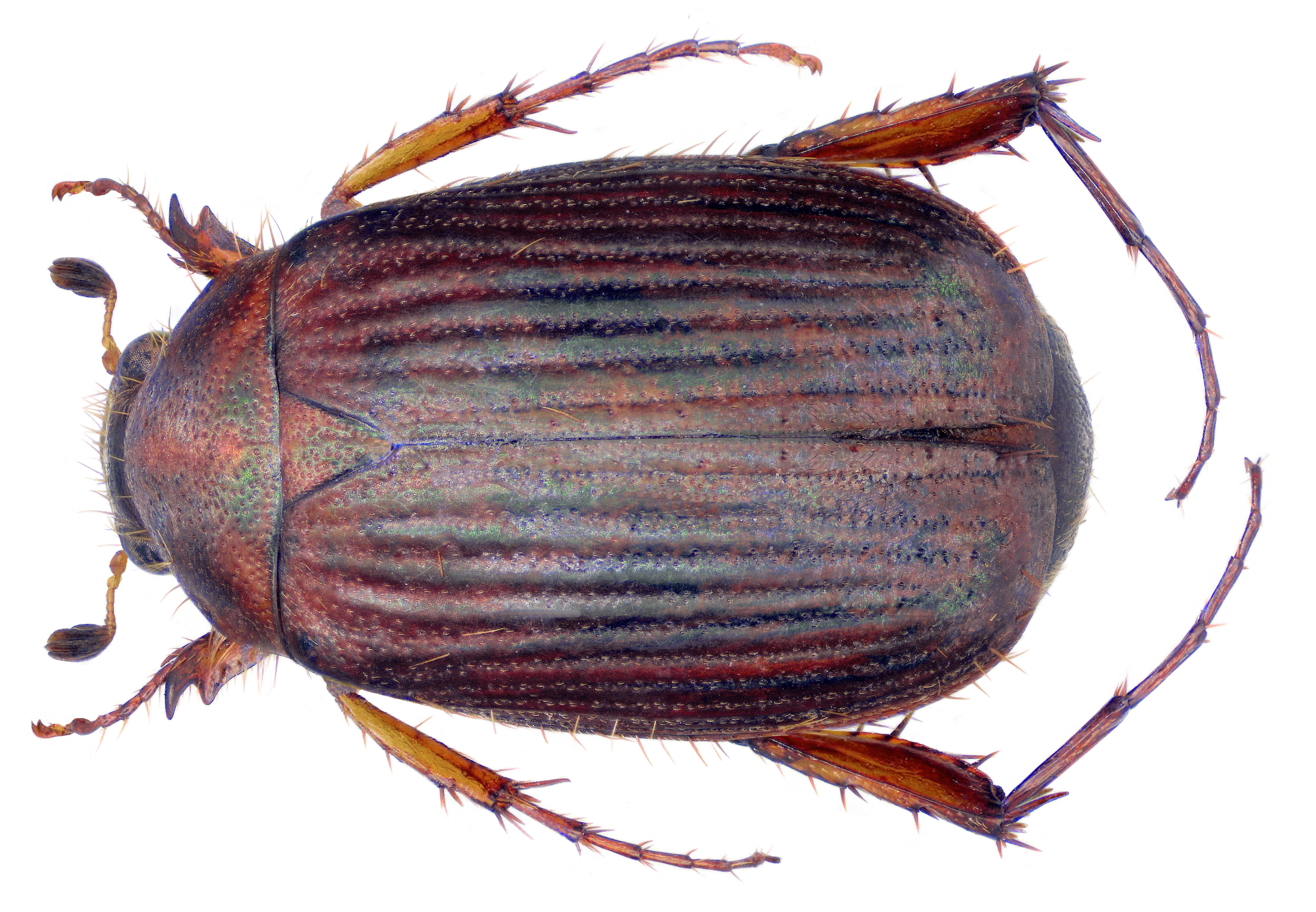

Scientific classification
- Kingdom: Animalia
- Phylum: Arthropoda
- Class: Insecta
- Order: Coleoptera
- Suborder: Polyphaga
- Infraorder: Scarabaeiformia
- Family: Scarabaeidae
- Genus: Gastroserica
- Species: G. dembickyi

Binomial name
- Gastroserica dembickyi Ahrens, 2000

= Gastroserica dembickyi =

Species of beetle

Gastroserica dembickyi is a species of beetle of the family Scarabaeidae. It is found in Vietnam.

== Description ==
Adults reach a length of about 8.6-8.7 mm. They have a yellowish brown, egg-shaped, oval body. There are sometimes two symmetrical dark stains on the disc of the pronotum and sometimes dark stripes on the intervals of the elytra. The dorsal surface is nearly glabrous, except for the cilia along the margins and some single, long setae on the elytra.

== Etymology ==
The species is named after its collector, Lubos Dembicky.
