= Gastroserica loei =

Scientific classification
- Kingdom: Animalia
- Phylum: Arthropoda
- Class: Insecta
- Order: Coleoptera
- Suborder: Polyphaga
- Infraorder: Scarabaeiformia
- Family: Scarabaeidae
- Genus: Gastroserica
- Species: G. loei

Binomial name
- Gastroserica loei Ahrens, Lukic & Liu, 2023

Species of beetle

Gastroserica loei is a species of beetle of the family Scarabaeidae. It is found in Thailand.

== Description ==
Adults reach a length of about 4.5–5.4 mm. They have a yellowish brown, oval body. The antennal club, frons and margins of the elytra are blackish and the dorsal surface is shiny and nearly glabrous.

== Etymology ==
The species is named after its occurrence in the Loei province.
