= Gastroserica bisignata =

Scientific classification
- Kingdom: Animalia
- Phylum: Arthropoda
- Class: Insecta
- Order: Coleoptera
- Suborder: Polyphaga
- Infraorder: Scarabaeiformia
- Family: Scarabaeidae
- Genus: Gastroserica
- Species: G. bisignata

Binomial name
- Gastroserica bisignata (Nomura, 1974)

Synonyms
- Microserica bisignata Nomura, 1974

Species of beetle

Gastroserica bisignata is a species of beetle of the family Scarabaeidae. It is found in Taiwan.
