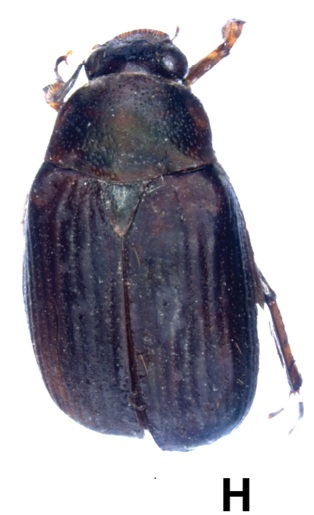

Scientific classification
- Kingdom: Animalia
- Phylum: Arthropoda
- Class: Insecta
- Order: Coleoptera
- Suborder: Polyphaga
- Infraorder: Scarabaeiformia
- Family: Scarabaeidae
- Genus: Gastroserica
- Species: G. liboensis

Binomial name
- Gastroserica liboensis Liu & Ahrens, 2014

= Gastroserica liboensis =

Species of beetle

Gastroserica liboensis is a species of beetle of the family Scarabaeidae. It is found in China (Guizhou).

== Description ==
Adults reach a length of about 8.9-9.1 mm. They have a dark brown, oval body. The ventral surface, labroclypeus and sides of the pronotum (including the footstalk of the antennae) are all reddish. The dorsal surface is dull, with moderately dense, long, erect setae.

== Etymology ==
The species is named after the type locality, Libo.
