= Gastroserica mayunshui =

Scientific classification
- Kingdom: Animalia
- Phylum: Arthropoda
- Class: Insecta
- Order: Coleoptera
- Suborder: Polyphaga
- Infraorder: Scarabaeiformia
- Family: Scarabaeidae
- Genus: Gastroserica
- Species: G. mayunshui

Binomial name
- Gastroserica mayunshui Zhao & Ahrens, 2023

Species of beetle

Gastroserica mayunshui is a species of beetle of the family Scarabaeidae. It is found in China (Guangdong).

== Description ==
Adults reach a length of about 6.8–7.9 mm. They have a yellowish brown, iridescent, elongated ovoid body. The abdomen, antennae and legs are shiny. The frons, two large, rectangular dark spots on each side of the pronotum, and two longitudinal bands on each side of the elytron are greenish brown.

== Etymology ==
The species is named after Mr. Yun-Shu Ma, who collected the majority of the type series.
