= Gastroserica impressicollis =

Scientific classification
- Kingdom: Animalia
- Phylum: Arthropoda
- Class: Insecta
- Order: Coleoptera
- Suborder: Polyphaga
- Infraorder: Scarabaeiformia
- Family: Scarabaeidae
- Genus: Gastroserica
- Species: G. impressicollis

Binomial name
- Gastroserica impressicollis (Fairmaire, 1891)

Synonyms
- Serica impressicollis Fairmaire, 1891

Species of beetle

Gastroserica impressicollis is a species of beetle of the family Scarabaeidae. It is found in China (Chongqing, Guangxi, Guizhou, Hubei, Jiangxi, Sichuan, Zhejiang).

== Description ==
Adults reach a length of about 6.6–7.5 mm. They have an elongate-oval body. The colour is variable, ranging from dark chestnut brown to yellowish-brown with two large dark stains on the pronotum. The legs are often lighter. The dorsal surface is iridescent and has fine, short hairs and a few single, longer setae.
