= Gastroserica huaphanensis =

Scientific classification
- Kingdom: Animalia
- Phylum: Arthropoda
- Class: Insecta
- Order: Coleoptera
- Suborder: Polyphaga
- Infraorder: Scarabaeiformia
- Family: Scarabaeidae
- Genus: Gastroserica
- Species: G. huaphanensis

Binomial name
- Gastroserica huaphanensis Ahrens & Pacholátko, 2003

Species of beetle

Gastroserica huaphanensis is a species of beetle of the family Scarabaeidae. It is found in Laos.

== Description ==
Adults reach a length of about 7.5–8.2 mm. They have a yellowish brown, oval body. The frons, antennal club, elytral margins as well as even intervals, and two symmetrical spots on the pronotal disc are dark brown. The dorsal surface is dull, with dark spots which are sometimes metallic green, and with moderately dense erect setae mixed with dense and short setae.

== Etymology ==
The species is named for its occurrence in Hua Phan province.
