= Gastroserica muongphangensis =

Scientific classification
- Kingdom: Animalia
- Phylum: Arthropoda
- Class: Insecta
- Order: Coleoptera
- Suborder: Polyphaga
- Infraorder: Scarabaeiformia
- Family: Scarabaeidae
- Genus: Gastroserica
- Species: G. muongphangensis

Binomial name
- Gastroserica muongphangensis Ahrens & Pham, 2023

Species of beetle

Gastroserica muongphangensis is a species of beetle of the family Scarabaeidae. It is found in Vietnam.

== Description ==
Adults reach a length of about 8.5 mm. They have a dark brown, oval body. The dorsal surface is dull and has robust, moderately dense, erect setae, mixed with dense and very short ones.

== Etymology ==
The species is named after the type locality, Muong Phang District, Dien Bien Province.
