= Gastroserica vindenensis =

Scientific classification
- Kingdom: Animalia
- Phylum: Arthropoda
- Class: Insecta
- Order: Coleoptera
- Suborder: Polyphaga
- Infraorder: Scarabaeiformia
- Family: Scarabaeidae
- Genus: Gastroserica
- Species: G. vindenensis

Binomial name
- Gastroserica vindenensis Ahrens & Fabrizi, 2018

Species of beetle

Gastroserica vindenensis is a species of beetle of the family Scarabaeidae. It is found in Vietnam.

== Description ==
Adults reach a length of about 8.2–8.3 mm. They have a reddish brown, oval body. The antennal shaft, pronotum and head are yellowish, while the frons, two indistinct large spots on the disc of the pronotum and antennal club are dark, the frons and pronotum with a weak iridescent shine. The dorsal surface is weakly shiny and sparsely covered with short setae and with moderately dense, longer, erect setae interspersed.

== Etymology ==
The species is named after its type locality, Vin Den.
