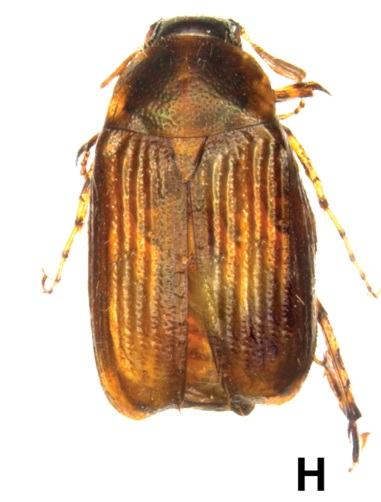

Scientific classification
- Kingdom: Animalia
- Phylum: Arthropoda
- Class: Insecta
- Order: Coleoptera
- Suborder: Polyphaga
- Infraorder: Scarabaeiformia
- Family: Scarabaeidae
- Genus: Gastroserica
- Species: G. fengduana

Binomial name
- Gastroserica fengduana Liu & Ahrens, 2014

= Gastroserica fengduana =

Species of beetle

Gastroserica fengduana is a species of beetle of the family Scarabaeidae. It is found in China (Sichuan).

== Description ==
Adults reach a length of about 7.3 mm. They have an oval body. The body, including the legs, is yellowish brown, while the head and disc of the pronotum are darker. The dorsal surface is moderately shiny, with sparse, long, erect setae.

== Etymology ==
The species is named after the type locality, Fengdu.
