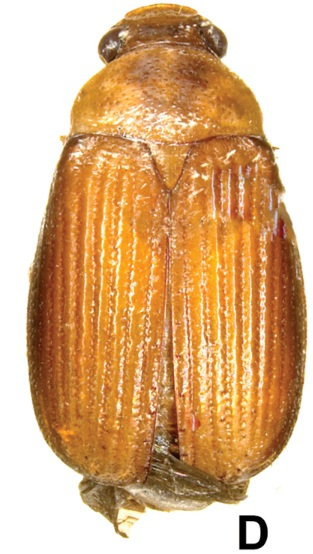

Scientific classification
- Kingdom: Animalia
- Phylum: Arthropoda
- Clade: Pancrustacea
- Class: Insecta
- Order: Coleoptera
- Suborder: Polyphaga
- Infraorder: Scarabaeiformia
- Family: Scarabaeidae
- Genus: Gastroserica
- Species: G. damingshanica

Binomial name
- Gastroserica damingshanica Liu & Ahrens, 2014

= Gastroserica damingshanica =

Species of beetle

Gastroserica damingshanica is a species of beetle of the family Scarabaeidae. It is found in China (Guangxi).

== Description ==
Adults reach a length of about 6.7 mm. They have an oval body. The pronotum and ventral surface are yellowish brown, while the frons and two spots on the disc of the pronotum are darker. The elytra are reddish brown, with the lateral intervals darker. The abdomen is dark brown to grey. The dorsal surface is moderately shiny, with sparse setae.

== Etymology ==
The species is named after the type locality, the Damingshan Mountains.
