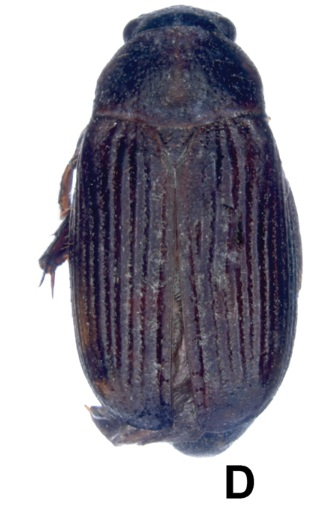

Scientific classification
- Kingdom: Animalia
- Phylum: Arthropoda
- Class: Insecta
- Order: Coleoptera
- Suborder: Polyphaga
- Infraorder: Scarabaeiformia
- Family: Scarabaeidae
- Genus: Gastroserica
- Species: G. jinxiuensis

Binomial name
- Gastroserica jinxiuensis Liu & Ahrens, 2014

= Gastroserica jinxiuensis =

Species of beetle

Gastroserica jinxiuensis is a species of beetle of the family Scarabaeidae. It is found in China (Guangxi).

== Description ==
Adults reach a length of about 8.8 mm. They have an oval body. The pronotum is dark brown and the surface is dull, the dorsal surface with moderately dense, long, erect setae.

== Etymology ==
The species is named after the type locality, Jinxiu.
