= Gastroserica roessneri =

Scientific classification
- Kingdom: Animalia
- Phylum: Arthropoda
- Class: Insecta
- Order: Coleoptera
- Suborder: Polyphaga
- Infraorder: Scarabaeiformia
- Family: Scarabaeidae
- Genus: Gastroserica
- Species: G. roessneri

Binomial name
- Gastroserica roessneri Ahrens, 2000

Species of beetle

Gastroserica roessneri is a species of beetle of the family Scarabaeidae. It is found in Vietnam.

== Description ==
Adults reach a length of about 8.4–9.7 mm. They have an iridescent, chestnut brown, egg-shaped, oval body. They are nearly glabrous, except for some setae on the disc of the pronotum and the margins of the elytra.

== Etymology ==
The species is named after a friend and colleague of the author, Eckehard Rossner.
