= Gastroserica contaminata =

Scientific classification
- Kingdom: Animalia
- Phylum: Arthropoda
- Class: Insecta
- Order: Coleoptera
- Suborder: Polyphaga
- Infraorder: Scarabaeiformia
- Family: Scarabaeidae
- Genus: Gastroserica
- Species: G. contaminata

Binomial name
- Gastroserica contaminata Ahrens & Pacholátko, 2003

Species of beetle

Gastroserica contaminata is a species of beetle of the family Scarabaeidae. It is found in Laos.

== Description ==
Adults reach a length of about 7.3 mm. They have an oval body. The ventral surface, labroclypeus, legs, elytra and lateral margins as well as a median stripe of the pronotum are all yellow, while the frons, elytral margins as well as spots on the intervals, and on the pronotal disc are dark brown, sometimes with a metallic-green shine. The dorsal surface is dull, with moderately dense erect setae mixed with dense and short ones.

== Etymology ==
The species name is derived from Latin contaminatus (meaning spotted).
