= Gastroserica kachin =

Scientific classification
- Kingdom: Animalia
- Phylum: Arthropoda
- Class: Insecta
- Order: Coleoptera
- Suborder: Polyphaga
- Infraorder: Scarabaeiformia
- Family: Scarabaeidae
- Genus: Gastroserica
- Species: G. kachin

Binomial name
- Gastroserica kachin Ahrens & Pham, 2023

Species of beetle

Gastroserica kachin is a species of beetle of the family Scarabaeidae. It is found in Myanmar.

== Description ==
Adults reach a length of about 5.2 mm. They have a dark blackish, oval body. The dorsal surface is shiny, with some blue-iridescent shine, while the legs and antennal club are black to dark brown. The antennal funiculus is yellow. The dorsal surface is nearly glabrous.

== Etymology ==
The species is named after its occurrence in the Kachin Province.
