= Gastroserica mausonensis =

Scientific classification
- Kingdom: Animalia
- Phylum: Arthropoda
- Class: Insecta
- Order: Coleoptera
- Suborder: Polyphaga
- Infraorder: Scarabaeiformia
- Family: Scarabaeidae
- Genus: Gastroserica
- Species: G. mausonensis

Binomial name
- Gastroserica mausonensis Ahrens, 2000

Species of beetle

Gastroserica mausonensis is a species of beetle of the family Scarabaeidae. It is found in Vietnam.

== Description ==
Adults reach a length of about 6.8 mm. They have a dark chestnut brown, elongate-oval body, with the legs and underside somewhat lighter. They are nearly glabrous, except for some setae on the elytra and along the margins of the pronotum and the elytra.
