= Gastroserica stictica =

Scientific classification
- Kingdom: Animalia
- Phylum: Arthropoda
- Class: Insecta
- Order: Coleoptera
- Suborder: Polyphaga
- Infraorder: Scarabaeiformia
- Family: Scarabaeidae
- Genus: Gastroserica
- Species: G. stictica

Binomial name
- Gastroserica stictica Ahrens & Pacholátko, 2003

Species of beetle

Gastroserica stictica is a species of beetle of the family Scarabaeidae. It is found in Laos.

== Description ==
Adults reach a length of about 7.1 mm. They have an oval body. The ventral surface, labroclypeus, legs, intervals three to five of the elytra, lateral margins, and a median stripe on the pronotum are all yellowish-brown, while the antennal club, frons, elytral margins, lateral and sutural intervals, spots on the intervals, and the pronotal disc are dark brown. The dark portions have a metallic-green shine. The dorsal surface is dull, with moderately dense erect setae mixed with dense and short setae.

== Etymology ==
The species name is derived from Latin sticticus (meaning punctate).
