= Gastroserica angustula =

Scientific classification
- Kingdom: Animalia
- Phylum: Arthropoda
- Class: Insecta
- Order: Coleoptera
- Suborder: Polyphaga
- Infraorder: Scarabaeiformia
- Family: Scarabaeidae
- Genus: Gastroserica
- Species: G. angustula

Binomial name
- Gastroserica angustula Brenske, 1898

Species of beetle

Gastroserica angustula is a species of beetle of the family Scarabaeidae. It is found in China (Guizhou).

== Description ==
Adults reach a length of about 7-7.3 mm. They have a dark chestnut brown, elongate-oval body. The dorsal surface is iridescent with a few single, long setae.
