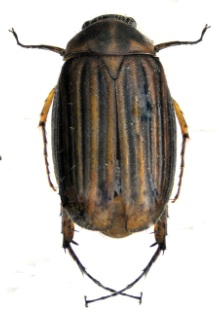

Scientific classification
- Kingdom: Animalia
- Phylum: Arthropoda
- Clade: Pancrustacea
- Class: Insecta
- Order: Coleoptera
- Suborder: Polyphaga
- Infraorder: Scarabaeiformia
- Family: Scarabaeidae
- Genus: Gastroserica
- Species: G. nigrofasciata

Binomial name
- Gastroserica nigrofasciata Liu, Ahrens, Bai & Yang, 2011

= Gastroserica nigrofasciata =

Species of beetle

Gastroserica nigrofasciata is a species of beetle of the family Scarabaeidae. It is found in China (Fujian, Guangxi, Guizhou).

== Description ==
Adults reach a length of about 5.6–8 mm. They have an oval body. The elytra and dorsal surface are both yellow, densely covered with short, fine adpressed setae and with moderately dense, long, erect setae interspersed.

== Etymology ==
The species name is derived from Latin nigro and fasciata (meaning black stripes).
