= Gastroserica bannok =

Scientific classification
- Kingdom: Animalia
- Phylum: Arthropoda
- Class: Insecta
- Order: Coleoptera
- Suborder: Polyphaga
- Infraorder: Scarabaeiformia
- Family: Scarabaeidae
- Genus: Gastroserica
- Species: G. bannok

Binomial name
- Gastroserica bannok Ahrens, Lukic & Liu, 2023

Species of beetle

Gastroserica bannok is a species of beetle of the family Scarabaeidae. It is found in Laos.

== Description ==
Adults reach a length of about 5 mm. They have a yellow, oval body. The antennal club is brown and the margins of the elytra and the frons blackish. The dorsal surface is shiny and nearly glabrous.

== Etymology ==
The name of the species is derived from the type locality, Ban Nok.
