= Gastroserica shaanxiana =

Scientific classification
- Kingdom: Animalia
- Phylum: Arthropoda
- Class: Insecta
- Order: Coleoptera
- Suborder: Polyphaga
- Infraorder: Scarabaeiformia
- Family: Scarabaeidae
- Genus: Gastroserica
- Species: G. shaanxiana

Binomial name
- Gastroserica shaanxiana Ahrens & Pacholátko, 2003

Species of beetle

Gastroserica shaanxiana is a species of beetle of the family Scarabaeidae. It is found in China (Shaanxi).

== Description ==
Adults reach a length of about 6.9–7.8 mm. They have a yellowish brown, oval body. The frons, antennal club, elytral margins and two symmetrical spots on the pronotal disc are dark brown. The dorsal surface is dull and densely covered with short setae and with moderately dense, longer, erect setae interspersed.

== Etymology ==
The species is named for its occurrence in Shaanxi province.
