= Gastroserica ivoi =

Scientific classification
- Kingdom: Animalia
- Phylum: Arthropoda
- Class: Insecta
- Order: Coleoptera
- Suborder: Polyphaga
- Infraorder: Scarabaeiformia
- Family: Scarabaeidae
- Genus: Gastroserica
- Species: G. ivoi

Binomial name
- Gastroserica ivoi Ahrens, Lukic & Liu, 2023

Species of beetle

Gastroserica ivoi is a species of beetle of the family Scarabaeidae. It is found in Thailand and China (Yunnan).

== Description ==
Adults reach a length of about 5–5.1 mm. They have an oval body. The body (including legs and antennae) is yellow, while two spots on the pronotum, the margins of the elytra and frons are blackish. The dorsal surface is shiny and nearly glabrous.

== Etymology ==
The species is named after one of its collectors, Ivo Martinů.
