= Gastroserica nikodymi =

Scientific classification
- Kingdom: Animalia
- Phylum: Arthropoda
- Clade: Pancrustacea
- Class: Insecta
- Order: Coleoptera
- Suborder: Polyphaga
- Infraorder: Scarabaeiformia
- Family: Scarabaeidae
- Genus: Gastroserica
- Species: G. nikodymi

Binomial name
- Gastroserica nikodymi Ahrens, 2000

Species of beetle

Gastroserica nikodymi is a species of beetle of the family Scarabaeidae. It is found in China (Fujian, Hunan, Jiangxi).

== Description ==
Adults reach a length of about 7.3–7.4 mm (0.287–0.291 in). They have a yellowish brown, egg-shaped, oval body, with the margins of the elytra somewhat darker. The dorsal surface is glabrous.

== Etymology ==
The species is named after a friend and colleague of the author, Milan Nikodym.
