= Gastroserica rubropicea =

Scientific classification
- Kingdom: Animalia
- Phylum: Arthropoda
- Class: Insecta
- Order: Coleoptera
- Suborder: Polyphaga
- Infraorder: Scarabaeiformia
- Family: Scarabaeidae
- Genus: Gastroserica
- Species: G. rubropicea

Binomial name
- Gastroserica rubropicea Ahrens, Lukic & Liu, 2023

Species of beetle

Gastroserica rubropicea is a species of beetle of the family Scarabaeidae. It is found in Myanmar.

== Description ==
Adults reach a length of about 5.4 mm. They have a yellowish brown, oval body. The pronotum and scutellum are reddish brown, while the frons and elytra are dark blue to blackish (the elytra iridescent). The legs and antennal club are brown and the dorsal surface is shiny and nearly glabrous.

== Etymology ==
The name of the species is derived from Latin piceus (meaning black) and rubrus (meaning red) and refers to the red and blackish body surface colour.
