= Gastroserica fumaria =

Scientific classification
- Kingdom: Animalia
- Phylum: Arthropoda
- Class: Insecta
- Order: Coleoptera
- Suborder: Polyphaga
- Infraorder: Scarabaeiformia
- Family: Scarabaeidae
- Genus: Gastroserica
- Species: G. fumaria

Binomial name
- Gastroserica fumaria Ahrens, Lukic & Liu, 2023

Species of beetle

Gastroserica fumaria is a species of beetle of the family Scarabaeidae. It is found in China (Yunnan) and Laos.

== Description ==
Adults reach a length of about 4.8–5.2 mm. They have a dark reddish brown, oval body, with part of the antennae a little lighter. The dorsal surface is iridescent shiny to moderately shiny, partly dull and nearly glabrous.

== Etymology ==
The species name is derived from Latin fumarius (meaning smoky-brown).
