= Gastroserica guangdongensis =

Scientific classification
- Kingdom: Animalia
- Phylum: Arthropoda
- Class: Insecta
- Order: Coleoptera
- Suborder: Polyphaga
- Infraorder: Scarabaeiformia
- Family: Scarabaeidae
- Genus: Gastroserica
- Species: G. guangdongensis

Binomial name
- Gastroserica guangdongensis Ahrens, 2000

Species of beetle

Gastroserica guangdongensis is a species of beetle of the family Scarabaeidae. It is found in China (Fujian, Guangdong, Guangxi, Hunan).

== Description ==
Adults reach a length of about 8–9.1 mm. They have an iridescent, chestnut brown, egg-shaped, oval body. They are nearly glabrous, except for some setae on the margins of the pronotum and the elytra.
