= Gastroserica nitidipyga =

Scientific classification
- Kingdom: Animalia
- Phylum: Arthropoda
- Class: Insecta
- Order: Coleoptera
- Suborder: Polyphaga
- Infraorder: Scarabaeiformia
- Family: Scarabaeidae
- Genus: Gastroserica
- Species: G. nitidipyga

Binomial name
- Gastroserica nitidipyga (Nomura, 1974)

Synonyms
- Microserica nitidipyga Nomura, 1974; Gastroserica formosana Kobayashi, 1991

Species of beetle

Gastroserica nitidipyga is a species of beetle of the family Scarabaeidae. It is found in China (Fujian, Guangxi) and Taiwan.

== Description ==
Adults reach a length of about 6-6.3 mm. They have an oval and compact body. The ventral surface and sides of the pygidium are blackish brown to black, while the antennal club, head and the middle of the pronotum are black and the legs, antennal footstalk and margins of the pronotum are yellowish brown to reddish brown. The elytra are yellowish brown to reddish brown, with an odd number of intervals blackish brown to black. The surface of the body is dully lustrous.
