= Gastroserica sulcata =

Scientific classification
- Kingdom: Animalia
- Phylum: Arthropoda
- Class: Insecta
- Order: Coleoptera
- Suborder: Polyphaga
- Infraorder: Scarabaeiformia
- Family: Scarabaeidae
- Genus: Gastroserica
- Species: G. sulcata

Binomial name
- Gastroserica sulcata Brenske, 1898

Species of beetle

Gastroserica sulcata is a species of beetle of the family Scarabaeidae. It is found in China (Guangxi, Guizhou, Hubei, Hunan, Zhejiang).

== Description ==
Adults reach a length of about 6.6–7 mm. They have an elongate-oval body. The dorsal surface is nearly glabrous. Males are nearly uniformly black, except for a red stain on the pronotum. Females are reddish to yellowish-brown
