= Gastroserica cognata =

Scientific classification
- Kingdom: Animalia
- Phylum: Arthropoda
- Class: Insecta
- Order: Coleoptera
- Suborder: Polyphaga
- Infraorder: Scarabaeiformia
- Family: Scarabaeidae
- Genus: Gastroserica
- Species: G. cognata

Binomial name
- Gastroserica cognata (Frey, 1972)

Synonyms
- Microserica cognata Frey, 1972

Species of beetle

Gastroserica cognata is a species of beetle of the family Scarabaeidae. It is found in Vietnam.

== Description ==
Adults reach a length of about 5.9 mm. They have an oval body. The body (including legs and antennae) is yellow and there are multiple symmetric, small dots on the pronotum and elytra. The abdomen (including pygidium) is dark brown, while the frons is slightly darker posteriorly. The dorsal surface is dull and nearly glabrous.
