= Gastroserica simaoensis =

Scientific classification
- Kingdom: Animalia
- Phylum: Arthropoda
- Class: Insecta
- Order: Coleoptera
- Suborder: Polyphaga
- Infraorder: Scarabaeiformia
- Family: Scarabaeidae
- Genus: Gastroserica
- Species: G. simaoensis

Binomial name
- Gastroserica simaoensis Ahrens, Lukic & Liu, 2023

Species of beetle

Gastroserica simaoensis is a species of beetle of the family Scarabaeidae. It is found in China (Yunnan) and Laos.

== Description ==
Adults reach a length of about 5.1–5.9 mm. They have a reddish brown, oval body. The antennae are yellow (with the club slightly darker) and the head, elytra and abdomen are blackish dark. The pronotum and scutellum are red. The dorsal surface is iridescent shiny, partly dull and nearly glabrous.

== Etymology ==
The species name is derived from the type locality, Simao.
