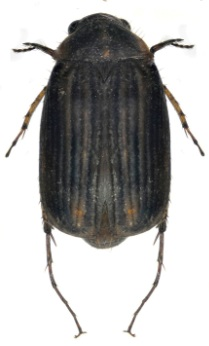

Scientific classification
- Kingdom: Animalia
- Phylum: Arthropoda
- Clade: Pancrustacea
- Class: Insecta
- Order: Coleoptera
- Suborder: Polyphaga
- Infraorder: Scarabaeiformia
- Family: Scarabaeidae
- Genus: Gastroserica
- Species: G. yunnanensis

Binomial name
- Gastroserica yunnanensis Liu, Ahrens, Bai & Yang, 2011

= Gastroserica yunnanensis =

Species of beetle

Gastroserica yunnanensis is a species of beetle of the family Scarabaeidae. It is found in China (Guangdong, Yunnan).

== Description ==
Adults reach a length of about 6–7 mm. They have an oval body. The elytra are brown and the dorsal surface is pale yellow to pale brown, densely covered with short, fine, adpressed setae and with moderately dense, long, erect setae interspersed. The abdominal sternites are dark brown to black.

== Etymology ==
The species name refers to its occurrence in Yunnan.
