= Gastroserica namthana =

Scientific classification
- Kingdom: Animalia
- Phylum: Arthropoda
- Class: Insecta
- Order: Coleoptera
- Suborder: Polyphaga
- Infraorder: Scarabaeiformia
- Family: Scarabaeidae
- Genus: Gastroserica
- Species: G. namthana

Binomial name
- Gastroserica namthana Ahrens, 2000

Species of beetle

Gastroserica namthana is a species of beetle of the family Scarabaeidae. It is found in Laos.

== Description ==
Adults reach a length of about 5.8–6.8 mm. They have a yellowish brown, egg-shaped, oval body, with two darker symmetrical stains on the pronotum. The pronotum also has lighter margins and three lighter stripes. The elytra have dark stripes. The dorsal surface has a coppery-green sheen and is nearly glabrous, except for the cilia along the margins of the pronotum and elytra and a few long setae on the elytra.
