= Gastroserica asulcata =

Scientific classification
- Kingdom: Animalia
- Phylum: Arthropoda
- Class: Insecta
- Order: Coleoptera
- Suborder: Polyphaga
- Infraorder: Scarabaeiformia
- Family: Scarabaeidae
- Genus: Gastroserica
- Species: G. asulcata

Binomial name
- Gastroserica asulcata Ahrens, 2000

Species of beetle

Gastroserica asulcata is a species of beetle of the family Scarabaeidae. It is found in China (Guangxi, Guizhou, Jiangxi, Sichuan, Yunnan) and Vietnam.

== Description ==
Adults reach a length of about 7.1-8.6 mm. They have a yellowish brown, egg-shaped, oval body. There are sometimes two symmetrical dark stains on the disc of the pronotum. The dorsal surface is nearly glabrous, except for the cilia along the margins.
