= Gastroserica lucidomarginalis =

Scientific classification
- Kingdom: Animalia
- Phylum: Arthropoda
- Class: Insecta
- Order: Coleoptera
- Suborder: Polyphaga
- Infraorder: Scarabaeiformia
- Family: Scarabaeidae
- Genus: Gastroserica
- Species: G. lucidomarginalis

Binomial name
- Gastroserica lucidomarginalis Ahrens, Lukic & Liu, 2023

Species of beetle

Gastroserica lucidomarginalis is a species of beetle of the family Scarabaeidae. It is found in Laos, Vietnam and China (Guangdong, Guangxi, Yunnan).

== Description ==
Adults reach a length of about 4.9–5.6 mm. They have a dark brown to blackish, oval body. The pronotum, center of the elytra and pygidium, legs and antennae are yellow, while the margins of the elytra and frons are dark. The dorsal surface is shiny and nearly glabrous.

== Etymology ==
The species name is derived from Latin lucidus (meaning shiny) and marginalis (meaning bordered) and refers to the shiny surface and the dark elytral margin.
