= Gastroserica kucerai =

Scientific classification
- Kingdom: Animalia
- Phylum: Arthropoda
- Class: Insecta
- Order: Coleoptera
- Suborder: Polyphaga
- Infraorder: Scarabaeiformia
- Family: Scarabaeidae
- Genus: Gastroserica
- Species: G. kucerai

Binomial name
- Gastroserica kucerai Ahrens & Pacholátko, 2003

Species of beetle

Gastroserica kucerai is a species of beetle of the family Scarabaeidae. It is found in China (Gansu, Guangxi, Hubei, Sichuan).

== Description ==
Adults reach a length of about 6.9–7.8 mm. They have a reddish to dark brown, oval body. The dorsal surface is dull and densely covered with short setae and with moderately dense, longer, erect setae interspersed.

== Etymology ==
The species is named after one of its collectors E. Kucera.
