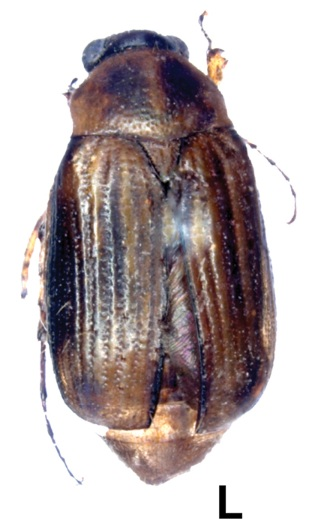

Scientific classification
- Kingdom: Animalia
- Phylum: Arthropoda
- Clade: Pancrustacea
- Class: Insecta
- Order: Coleoptera
- Suborder: Polyphaga
- Infraorder: Scarabaeiformia
- Family: Scarabaeidae
- Genus: Gastroserica
- Species: G. wenzhui

Binomial name
- Gastroserica wenzhui Liu & Ahrens, 2014

Synonyms
- Gastroserica skalei Ahrens & Fabrizi, 2018

= Gastroserica wenzhui =

Species of beetle

Gastroserica wenzhui is a species of beetle of the family Scarabaeidae. It is found in China (Guangxi) and northern Vietnam.

== Description ==
Adults reach a length of about 7.1–7.8 mm. They have a yellowish brown, oval body. The frons, two large maculae and the fourth and lateral intervals of the elytra, as well as the abdomen are darker. The dorsal surface is moderately shiny, the frons and disc of the pronotum with some greenish sheen, and with moderately dense, long, erect setae.

== Etymology ==
The species is named after one of its collectors, Li Wenzhu.
