= Gastroserica yuebaensis =

Scientific classification
- Kingdom: Animalia
- Phylum: Arthropoda
- Clade: Pancrustacea
- Class: Insecta
- Order: Coleoptera
- Suborder: Polyphaga
- Infraorder: Scarabaeiformia
- Family: Scarabaeidae
- Genus: Gastroserica
- Species: G. yuebaensis

Binomial name
- Gastroserica yuebaensis Ahrens, Lukic & Liu, 2023

Species of beetle

Gastroserica yuebaensis is a species of beetle of the family Scarabaeidae. It is found in China (Shaanxi).

== Description ==
Adults reach a length of about 6 mm. They have a dark brown, oval body. The legs, a longitudinal stripe at the middle of the elytra (and its lateral margin), the margins of the pronotum, the labroclypeus, the apex of the scutellum and part of the antennae are yellowish, while the antennal club is brown. The dorsal surface is dull and nearly glabrous.

== Etymology ==
The species name is derived from the name of the type locality, Yueba.
