= Gastroserica trilineata =

Scientific classification
- Kingdom: Animalia
- Phylum: Arthropoda
- Class: Insecta
- Order: Coleoptera
- Suborder: Polyphaga
- Infraorder: Scarabaeiformia
- Family: Scarabaeidae
- Genus: Gastroserica
- Species: G. trilineata

Binomial name
- Gastroserica trilineata Ahrens, 2000

Species of beetle

Gastroserica trilineata is a species of beetle of the family Scarabaeidae. It is found in Vietnam.

== Description ==
Adults reach a length of about 7.3 mm. They have a yellowish brown, elongate-oval body, with some dark brown markings and stripes. The dorsal surface is glabrous.
