= Gastroserica piceocoerulea =

Scientific classification
- Kingdom: Animalia
- Phylum: Arthropoda
- Class: Insecta
- Order: Coleoptera
- Suborder: Polyphaga
- Infraorder: Scarabaeiformia
- Family: Scarabaeidae
- Genus: Gastroserica
- Species: G. piceocoerulea

Binomial name
- Gastroserica piceocoerulea Ahrens, Lukic & Liu, 2023

Species of beetle

Gastroserica piceocoerulea is a species of beetle of the family Scarabaeidae. It is found in Laos, Thailand and China (Yunnan).

== Description ==
Adults reach a length of about 4.6–6 mm. They have a dark brown to blackish, oval body, the pronotum with some greenish shine and the elytra blue-iridescent. The legs and antennal club are brown and the dorsal surface is shiny and nearly glabrous.

== Etymology ==
The name of the species is derived from Latin piceus (meaning black) and coeruleus (meaning blue) and refers to the dark, iridescent shiny body surface.
