= Gastroserica dohertyi =

Scientific classification
- Kingdom: Animalia
- Phylum: Arthropoda
- Class: Insecta
- Order: Coleoptera
- Suborder: Polyphaga
- Infraorder: Scarabaeiformia
- Family: Scarabaeidae
- Genus: Gastroserica
- Species: G. dohertyi

Binomial name
- Gastroserica dohertyi Ahrens & Fabrizi, 2009

Synonyms
- Microserica dohertyi Ahrens & Fabrizi, 2009

Species of beetle

Gastroserica dohertyi is a species of beetle of the family Scarabaeidae. It is found in India (Assam, Patkai Mountains).

== Description ==
Adults reach a length of about 5.4 mm. They have a reddish brown, short, oval body with a somewhat iridescent shine. The head, antennal club, middle of the pronotum and most of the elytra are blackish. The dorsal surface is nearly glabrous.

== Etymology ==
The species is named after its collector, W. Doherty.
