= Gastroserica bicolor =

Scientific classification
- Kingdom: Animalia
- Phylum: Arthropoda
- Clade: Pancrustacea
- Class: Insecta
- Order: Coleoptera
- Suborder: Polyphaga
- Infraorder: Scarabaeiformia
- Family: Scarabaeidae
- Genus: Gastroserica
- Species: G. bicolor

Binomial name
- Gastroserica bicolor Niijima & Matsumura, 1923

Species of beetle

Gastroserica bicolor is a species of beetle of the family Scarabaeidae. It is found in Taiwan.

== Description ==
Adults reach a length of about 7 mm. They have a dull, black, elongate-oval body, with yellowish-brown longitudinal lines.
