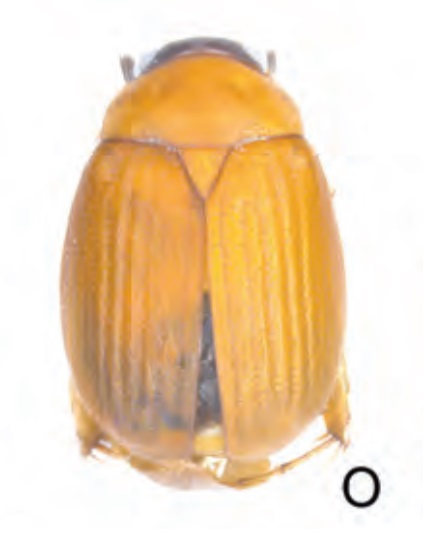

Scientific classification
- Kingdom: Animalia
- Phylum: Arthropoda
- Class: Insecta
- Order: Coleoptera
- Suborder: Polyphaga
- Infraorder: Scarabaeiformia
- Family: Scarabaeidae
- Genus: Gastroserica
- Species: G. roingensis

Binomial name
- Gastroserica roingensis (Ahrens & Fabrizi, 2016)

Synonyms
- Microserica roingensis Ahrens & Fabrizi, 2016

= Gastroserica roingensis =

Species of beetle

Gastroserica roingensis is a species of beetle of the family Scarabaeidae. It is found in India (Arunachal Pradesh).

== Description ==
Adults reach a length of about 5.5 mm. They have a yellow, oval body. The dorsal surface is dull and nearly glabrous.

== Etymology ==
The species is named for its type locality, Roing.
