= Gastroserica herzi =

Scientific classification
- Kingdom: Animalia
- Phylum: Arthropoda
- Class: Insecta
- Order: Coleoptera
- Suborder: Polyphaga
- Infraorder: Scarabaeiformia
- Family: Scarabaeidae
- Genus: Gastroserica
- Species: G. herzi

Binomial name
- Gastroserica herzi (Heyden, 1887)

Synonyms
- Serica herzi Heyden, 1887

Species of beetle

Gastroserica herzi is a species of beetle of the family Scarabaeidae. It is found in China (Fujian, Guizhou, Guangxi, Heilongjiang, Hunan, Jiangxi, Sichuan, Zhejiang) and Korea.

== Description ==
Adults reach a length of about 6.1-6.6 mm. They have an elongate-oval body. The colour is variable. The pronotum ranging from black with only a faint red spot to light brown. The legs are often lighter. The dorsal surface is nearly glabrous.
