= Gastroserica cucphongensis =

Scientific classification
- Kingdom: Animalia
- Phylum: Arthropoda
- Class: Insecta
- Order: Coleoptera
- Suborder: Polyphaga
- Infraorder: Scarabaeiformia
- Family: Scarabaeidae
- Genus: Gastroserica
- Species: G. cucphongensis

Binomial name
- Gastroserica cucphongensis Fabrizi & Ahrens, 2020

Species of beetle

Gastroserica cucphongensis is a species of beetle of the family Scarabaeidae. It is found in Vietnam.

== Description ==
Adults reach a length of about 6.2 mm. They have a yellowish brown, oval body. The frons, even intervals of the elytra and two elongate sublateral spots on the pronotum are darker, these dark parts with a greenish shine. The dorsal surface is moderately shiny and sparsely covered with short setae.

== Etymology ==
The species is named after its type locality, Cuc Phuong.
