= Gastroserica quateorum =

Scientific classification
- Kingdom: Animalia
- Phylum: Arthropoda
- Class: Insecta
- Order: Coleoptera
- Suborder: Polyphaga
- Infraorder: Scarabaeiformia
- Family: Scarabaeidae
- Genus: Gastroserica
- Species: G. quateorum

Binomial name
- Gastroserica quateorum (Frey, 1972)

Synonyms
- Microserica quateorum Frey, 1972

Species of beetle

Gastroserica quateorum is a species of beetle of the family Scarabaeidae. It is found in Vietnam.

== Description ==
Adults reach a length of about 5.2 mm. They have a brown, oval body. The head, legs, antennae,anterior parts of the elytra and margins and a median line of the pronotum are yellowish. The dorsal surface is iridescent shiny, partly dull and nearly glabrous.
