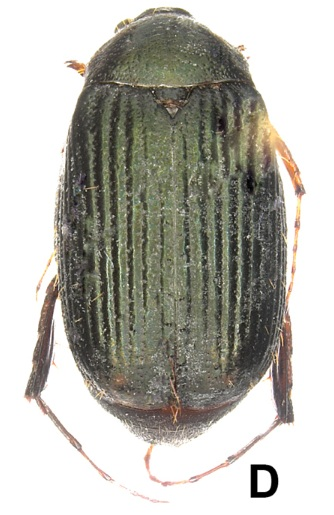

Scientific classification
- Kingdom: Animalia
- Phylum: Arthropoda
- Class: Insecta
- Order: Coleoptera
- Suborder: Polyphaga
- Infraorder: Scarabaeiformia
- Family: Scarabaeidae
- Genus: Gastroserica
- Species: G. carolusi

Binomial name
- Gastroserica carolusi Liu & Ahrens, 2014

= Gastroserica carolusi =

Species of beetle

Gastroserica carolusi is a species of beetle of the family Scarabaeidae. It is found in Laos.

== Description ==
Adults reach a length of about 7.1–7.8 mm. They have an oval body. The legs are dark brown and the elytra and dorsal surface are black with a greenish shine. There is a brown spot on each side of the pronotum. The dorsal surface is dull, with minute, moderately dense setae and sparse, long, erect setae interspersed.

== Etymology ==
The species is named after one of its collectors, Carious Holzschuh.
