= Gastroserica lucens =

Scientific classification
- Kingdom: Animalia
- Phylum: Arthropoda
- Class: Insecta
- Order: Coleoptera
- Suborder: Polyphaga
- Infraorder: Scarabaeiformia
- Family: Scarabaeidae
- Genus: Gastroserica
- Species: G. lucens

Binomial name
- Gastroserica lucens (Ahrens & Fabrizi, 2009)

Synonyms
- Microserica lucens Ahrens & Fabrizi, 2009

Species of beetle

Gastroserica lucens is a species of beetle of the family Scarabaeidae. It is found in India (Arunachal Pradesh).

== Description ==
Adults reach a length of about 5.7-6.4 mm. They have a strongly shiny, short, oval body. The ventral surface is dark brown and the dorsal surface is blackish and nearly glabrous. The legs are yellowish.

== Etymology ==
The species name is derived from Latin lucens and refers to the shiny dorsal surface.
