= Gastroserica hiulca =

Scientific classification
- Kingdom: Animalia
- Phylum: Arthropoda
- Class: Insecta
- Order: Coleoptera
- Suborder: Polyphaga
- Infraorder: Scarabaeiformia
- Family: Scarabaeidae
- Genus: Gastroserica
- Species: G. hiulca

Binomial name
- Gastroserica hiulca (Brenske, 1898)

Synonyms
- Microserica hiulca Brenske, 1898

Species of beetle

Gastroserica hiulca is a species of beetle of the family Scarabaeidae. It is found in China (Guangxi, Guizhou, Hubei, Hunan, Jiangxi) and Vietnam.

== Description ==
Adults reach a length of about 5.4 mm. They have a yellowish brown, oval body. The head, center of the pronotum and ventral surface (including abdomen and most parts of the pygidium) are darker brown. The dorsal surface is iridescent shiny or sometimes dull and nearly glabrous.
