= Gastroserica fanjingensis =

Scientific classification
- Kingdom: Animalia
- Phylum: Arthropoda
- Class: Insecta
- Order: Coleoptera
- Suborder: Polyphaga
- Infraorder: Scarabaeiformia
- Family: Scarabaeidae
- Genus: Gastroserica
- Species: G. fanjingensis

Binomial name
- Gastroserica fanjingensis Ahrens, 2000

Species of beetle

Gastroserica fanjingensis is a species of beetle of the family Scarabaeidae. It is found in China (Guangxi, Guizhou, Sichuan).

== Description ==
Adults reach a length of about 6.8-6.9 mm. They have a yellowish brown, egg-shaped, oval body. There are two symmetrical stains on the pronotum and the margins of the elytra are somewhat darker. The dorsal surface is nearly glabrous, except for some single, erect setae.
