= Gastroserica horii =

Scientific classification
- Kingdom: Animalia
- Phylum: Arthropoda
- Class: Insecta
- Order: Coleoptera
- Suborder: Polyphaga
- Infraorder: Scarabaeiformia
- Family: Scarabaeidae
- Genus: Gastroserica
- Species: G. horii

Binomial name
- Gastroserica horii Ahrens & Pham, 2023

Species of beetle

Gastroserica horii is a species of beetle of the family Scarabaeidae. It is found in Vietnam.

== Description ==
Adults reach a length of about 5.2 mm. They have an oval body. The body, antennal club, middle and hind legs, head, elytra, scutellum and abdomen are blackish dark, while the pronotum (including anterior legs) is reddish brown. The dorsal surface is dull and nearly glabrous.

== Etymology ==
The species is named after its collector, Michio Hori.
