= Gastroserica viridis =

Scientific classification
- Kingdom: Animalia
- Phylum: Arthropoda
- Class: Insecta
- Order: Coleoptera
- Suborder: Polyphaga
- Infraorder: Scarabaeiformia
- Family: Scarabaeidae
- Genus: Gastroserica
- Species: G. viridis

Binomial name
- Gastroserica viridis Ahrens, 2000

Species of beetle

Gastroserica viridis is a species of beetle of the family Scarabaeidae. It is found in Laos.

== Description ==
Adults reach a length of about 6.6–7.3 mm. They have a yellowish brown, egg-shaped, oval body. The elytra and pronotum are metallic green, the latter with yellow margins and stripes. The dorsal surface is nearly glabrous, except for the cilia along the margins of the pronotum and elytra and a few long setae on the elytra.
