= Gastroserica =

Scientific classification
- Kingdom: Animalia
- Phylum: Arthropoda
- Class: Insecta
- Order: Coleoptera
- Suborder: Polyphaga
- Infraorder: Scarabaeiformia
- Family: Scarabaeidae
- Subfamily: Sericinae
- Tribe: Sericini
- Genus: Gastroserica; Brenske, 1894

Genus of leaf beetles

Gastroserica is a genus of beetles belonging to the family Scarabaeidae.

== Species ==
- Subgenus Gastroserica
  - Gastroserica angustula Brenske, 1898
  - Gastroserica asulcata Ahrens, 2000
  - Gastroserica bicolor Niijima & Matsumura, 1923
  - Gastroserica bilyi Ahrens, 2000
  - Gastroserica brevicornis (Lewis, 1895)
  - Gastroserica carolusi Liu & Ahrens, 2014
  - Gastroserica contaminata Ahrens & Pacholátko, 2003
  - Gastroserica cucphongensis Fabrizi & Ahrens, 2020
  - Gastroserica damingshanica Liu & Ahrens, 2014
  - Gastroserica dembickyi Ahrens, 2000
  - Gastroserica fanjingensis Ahrens, 2000
  - Gastroserica fengduana Liu & Ahrens, 2014
  - Gastroserica gemellata Ahrens & Pacholátko, 2007
  - Gastroserica guangdongensis Ahrens, 2000
  - Gastroserica guizhouana Ahrens, 2000
  - Gastroserica haoyui Liu & Ahrens, 2014
  - Gastroserica haucki Ahrens, 2000
  - Gastroserica herzi (Heyden, 1887)
  - Gastroserica higonia (Lewis, 1895)
  - Gastroserica huaphanensis Ahrens & Pacholátko, 2003
  - Gastroserica hubeiana Ahrens, 2000
  - Gastroserica impressicollis (Fairmaire, 1891)
  - Gastroserica jinxiuensis Liu & Ahrens, 2014
  - Gastroserica kabakovi Ahrens, 2002
  - Gastroserica kucerai Ahrens & Pacholátko, 2003
  - Gastroserica liboensis Liu & Ahrens, 2014
  - Gastroserica marginalis (Brenske, 1894)
  - Gastroserica mausonensis Ahrens, 2000
  - Gastroserica mayunshui Zhao & Ahrens, 2023
  - Gastroserica muongphangensis Ahrens & Pham, 2023
  - Gastroserica namthana Ahrens, 2000
  - Gastroserica napolovi Ahrens, 2000
  - Gastroserica nigrofasciata Liu, Ahrens, Bai & Yang, 2011
  - Gastroserica nikodymi Ahrens, 2000
  - Gastroserica patkaiensis Ahrens, 2000
  - Gastroserica pickai Ahrens, 2000
  - Gastroserica roessneri Ahrens, 2000
  - Gastroserica shaanxiana Ahrens & Pacholátko, 2003
  - Gastroserica sichuana Ahrens, 2000
  - Gastroserica similaris Kobayashi, 2015
  - Gastroserica stictica Ahrens & Pacholátko, 2003
  - Gastroserica sulcata Brenske, 1898
  - Gastroserica trilineata Ahrens, 2000
  - Gastroserica vindenensis Ahrens & Fabrizi, 2018
  - Gastroserica vinhphuensis Ahrens, 2000
  - Gastroserica viridis Ahrens, 2000
  - Gastroserica wenzhui Liu & Ahrens, 2014
  - Gastroserica yingi Ahrens & Pacholátko, 2007
  - Gastroserica yunnanensis Liu, Ahrens, Bai & Yang, 2011
- Subgenus Helioserica Ahrens, Lukic & Liu, 2023
  - Gastroserica bannok Ahrens, Lukic & Liu, 2023
  - Gastroserica bisignata (Nomura, 1974)
  - Gastroserica cognata (Frey, 1972)
  - Gastroserica dohertyi (Ahrens & Fabrizi, 2009)
  - Gastroserica fukiensis Frey, 1972
  - Gastroserica fumaria Ahrens, Lukic & Liu, 2023
  - Gastroserica hiulca (Brenske, 1898)
  - Gastroserica horii Ahrens & Pham, 2023
  - Gastroserica ivoi Ahrens, Lukic & Liu, 2023
  - Gastroserica kachin Ahrens & Pham, 2023
  - Gastroserica loei Ahrens, Lukic & Liu, 2023
  - Gastroserica lucens (Ahrens & Fabrizi, 2009)
  - Gastroserica lucidomarginalis Ahrens, Lukic & Liu, 2023
  - Gastroserica nitidipyga (Nomura, 1974)
  - Gastroserica phukradung Ahrens, Lukic & Liu, 2023
  - Gastroserica piceocoerulea Ahrens, Lukic & Liu, 2023
  - Gastroserica quateorum (Frey, 1972)
  - Gastroserica roingensis (Ahrens & Fabrizi, 2016)
  - Gastroserica rubropicea Ahrens, Lukic & Liu, 2023
  - Gastroserica simaoensis Ahrens, Lukic & Liu, 2023
  - Gastroserica varians (Moser, 1915)
  - Gastroserica yuebaensis Ahrens, Lukic & Liu, 2023
