= Gastroserica kabakovi =

Scientific classification
- Kingdom: Animalia
- Phylum: Arthropoda
- Class: Insecta
- Order: Coleoptera
- Suborder: Polyphaga
- Infraorder: Scarabaeiformia
- Family: Scarabaeidae
- Genus: Gastroserica
- Species: G. kabakovi

Binomial name
- Gastroserica kabakovi Ahrens, 2002

Species of beetle

Gastroserica kabakovi is a species of beetle of the family Scarabaeidae. It is found in China (Yunnan) and Vietnam.

== Description ==
Adults reach a length of about 6.7-8.6 mm. They have a yellowish-brown, egg-shaped, oval body, which an iridescent to greenish-metallic shine. Sometimes, there are two symmetrical dark stains on the disc of the pronotum. The dorsal is surface is nearly glabrous, except for the cilia along the margins of the pronotum and elytra.

== Etymology ==
The species is named after its collector, O. N. Kabakov.
