= Gastroserica hubeiana =

Scientific classification
- Kingdom: Animalia
- Phylum: Arthropoda
- Class: Insecta
- Order: Coleoptera
- Suborder: Polyphaga
- Infraorder: Scarabaeiformia
- Family: Scarabaeidae
- Genus: Gastroserica
- Species: G. hubeiana

Binomial name
- Gastroserica hubeiana Ahrens, 2000

Species of beetle

Gastroserica hubeiana is a species of beetle of the family Scarabaeidae. It is found in China (Hubei, Sichuan, Zhejiang).

== Description ==
Adults reach a length of about 7.4-7.5 mm. They have a reddish-brown, egg-shaped, oval body, with the pronotum, labroclypeus, scutellum and legs yellowish brown. There are two symmetric, dark green stains on the pronotum. There are single, dense setae on the head and elytra.
