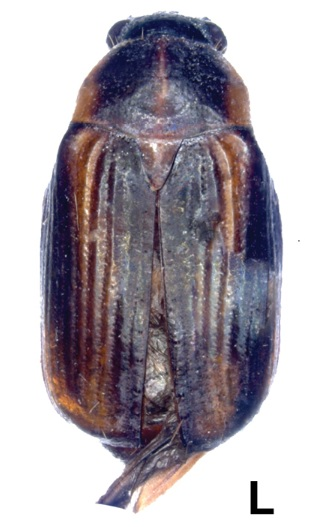

Scientific classification
- Kingdom: Animalia
- Phylum: Arthropoda
- Class: Insecta
- Order: Coleoptera
- Suborder: Polyphaga
- Infraorder: Scarabaeiformia
- Family: Scarabaeidae
- Genus: Gastroserica
- Species: G. haoyui

Binomial name
- Gastroserica haoyui Liu & Ahrens, 2014

= Gastroserica haoyui =

Species of beetle

Gastroserica haoyui is a species of beetle of the family Scarabaeidae. It is found in China (Zhejiang).

== Description ==
Adults reach a length of about 7.2 mm. They have a dark brown, oval body. The legs, antennae, labroclypeus, midline and lateral margins of the pronotum and a moderately wide longitudinal stripe on the elytra are all yellowish brown. The dorsal surface is moderately shiny, with moderately dense, long, erect setae.

== Etymology ==
The species is named after its collector, Liu Haoyu.
