= Gastroserica bilyi =

Scientific classification
- Kingdom: Animalia
- Phylum: Arthropoda
- Class: Insecta
- Order: Coleoptera
- Suborder: Polyphaga
- Infraorder: Scarabaeiformia
- Family: Scarabaeidae
- Genus: Gastroserica
- Species: G. bilyi

Binomial name
- Gastroserica bilyi Ahrens, 2000

Species of beetle

Gastroserica bilyi is a species of beetle of the family Scarabaeidae. It is found in Thailand and China (Yunnan).

== Description ==
Adults reach a length of about 5.8-6.3 mm. They have a yellowish brown, egg-shaped, oval body. The pronotum is darker and has lighter margins and three lighter stripes. The pronotum also has lighter margins and three lighter stripes. The elytra have dark stripes. The dorsal surface has a coppery-green sheen and is nearly glabrous, except for the cilia along the margins of the pronotum and elytra and a few long setae on the elytra.

== Etymology ==
The species is named after its collector, S. Bily.
