= Gastroserica sichuana =

Scientific classification
- Kingdom: Animalia
- Phylum: Arthropoda
- Class: Insecta
- Order: Coleoptera
- Suborder: Polyphaga
- Infraorder: Scarabaeiformia
- Family: Scarabaeidae
- Genus: Gastroserica
- Species: G. sichuana

Binomial name
- Gastroserica sichuana Ahrens, 2000

Species of beetle

Gastroserica sichuana is a species of beetle of the family Scarabaeidae. It is found in China (Sichuan) and possibly Vietnam.

== Description ==
Adults reach a length of about 7-7.8 mm. They have a dark reddish-brown, egg-shaped, oval body, with the pronotum, labroclypeus, scutellum and legs yellowish brown. There are two symmetric, dark green stains on the pronotum.
