= Gastroserica haucki =

Scientific classification
- Kingdom: Animalia
- Phylum: Arthropoda
- Class: Insecta
- Order: Coleoptera
- Suborder: Polyphaga
- Infraorder: Scarabaeiformia
- Family: Scarabaeidae
- Genus: Gastroserica
- Species: G. haucki

Binomial name
- Gastroserica haucki Ahrens, 2000

Species of beetle

Gastroserica haucki is a species of beetle of the family Scarabaeidae. It is found in Laos, Thailand and China (Yunnan).

== Description ==
Adults reach a length of about 5.6-6.2 mm. They have an egg-shaped, oval body. The colour is variable, but often yellowish-brown with a blackish brown elytra and pronotum, the latter with yellow margins and stripes. The dorsal surface is nearly glabrous, except for the cilia along the margins of the pronotum and elytra and a few long setae on the elytra.
