= Gastroserica phukradung =

Scientific classification
- Kingdom: Animalia
- Phylum: Arthropoda
- Class: Insecta
- Order: Coleoptera
- Suborder: Polyphaga
- Infraorder: Scarabaeiformia
- Family: Scarabaeidae
- Genus: Gastroserica
- Species: G. phukradung

Binomial name
- Gastroserica phukradung Ahrens, Lukic & Liu, 2023

Species of beetle

Gastroserica phukradung is a species of beetle of the family Scarabaeidae. It is found in Thailand.

== Description ==
Adults reach a length of about 5.6 mm. They have an oval body. The body (including legs and antennae) is yellowish brown, while the abdomen, middle of the pronotum, margins of the elytra and frons are blackish, with the antennal club a little darker. The dorsal surface is iridescent shiny to weakly dull and nearly glabrous.

== Etymology ==
The species is named after its occurrence in the Phu Kradun province.
