= Gastroserica yingi =

Scientific classification
- Kingdom: Animalia
- Phylum: Arthropoda
- Class: Insecta
- Order: Coleoptera
- Suborder: Polyphaga
- Infraorder: Scarabaeiformia
- Family: Scarabaeidae
- Genus: Gastroserica
- Species: G. yingi

Binomial name
- Gastroserica yingi Ahrens & Pacholátko, 2007

Species of beetle

Gastroserica yingi is a species of beetle of the family Scarabaeidae. It is found in China (Guangxi, Hainan, Yunnan).

== Description ==
Adults reach a length of about 7.6 mm. They have a dark brown, oval and egg shaped body. The elytra are blackish and the dorsal surface is dull and has moderately dense erect setae mixed with dense and very short ones.

== Etymology ==
The species name refers to one of its collectors, Mr. Ying.
