= Gastroserica marginalis =

Scientific classification
- Kingdom: Animalia
- Phylum: Arthropoda
- Class: Insecta
- Order: Coleoptera
- Suborder: Polyphaga
- Infraorder: Scarabaeiformia
- Family: Scarabaeidae
- Genus: Gastroserica
- Species: G. marginalis

Binomial name
- Gastroserica marginalis (Brenske, 1894)

Synonyms
- Serica marginalis Brenske, 1894; Gastroserica marginalis puncticollis Brenske, 1898

Species of beetle

Gastroserica marginalis is a species of beetle of the family Scarabaeidae. It is found in China (Fujian, Guangxi, Guizhou, Hainan, Hong Kong, Hubei, Hunan, Jiangxi, Shandong, Shanghai, Sichuan, Zhejiang), Taiwan, Laos, Myanmar and Vietnam.

== Description ==
Adults reach a length of about 7.3–7.5 mm. They have a yellowish brown, egg-shaped, oval body, sometimes with two symmetrical dark stains on the disc of the pronotum and dark stripes on the intervals of the elytra. The dorsal surface is nearly glabrous, except for the cilia along the margins of the elytra and some single, long setea on the elytra.
