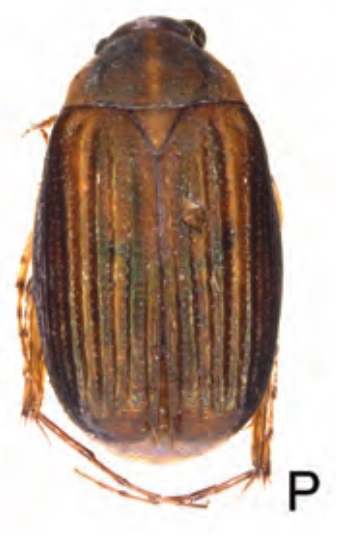

Scientific classification
- Kingdom: Animalia
- Phylum: Arthropoda
- Class: Insecta
- Order: Coleoptera
- Suborder: Polyphaga
- Infraorder: Scarabaeiformia
- Family: Scarabaeidae
- Genus: Gastroserica
- Species: G. patkaiensis

Binomial name
- Gastroserica patkaiensis Ahrens, 2000

= Gastroserica patkaiensis =

Species of beetle

Gastroserica patkaiensis is a species of beetle of the family Scarabaeidae. It is found in India (Assam) and China (Yunnan).

== Description ==
Adults reach a length of about 7 mm. They have a yellowish brown, egg-shaped, oval body. The pronotum is darker and has lighter margins and two lighter stripes. The pronotum also has lighter margins and three lighter stripes. The elytra have dark stripes. The dorsal surface has a coppery-green sheen and is nearly glabrous, except for the cilia along the margins of the pronotum and elytra.
