= Gastroserica brevicornis =

Scientific classification
- Kingdom: Animalia
- Phylum: Arthropoda
- Class: Insecta
- Order: Coleoptera
- Suborder: Polyphaga
- Infraorder: Scarabaeiformia
- Family: Scarabaeidae
- Genus: Gastroserica
- Species: G. brevicornis

Binomial name
- Gastroserica brevicornis (Lewis, 1895)

Synonyms
- Serica brevicornis Lewis, 1895; Microserica nikkonensis Brenske, 1898

Species of beetle

Gastroserica brevicornis is a species of beetle of the family Scarabaeidae. It is found in Japan.

== Description ==
Adults reach a length of about 7-7.5 mm. They have a pale testaceous, oblong body, which is opalescent in parts. They are irregularly punctured. The elytra are striate, with punctures faintly seen in the lines. The legs are pale.
