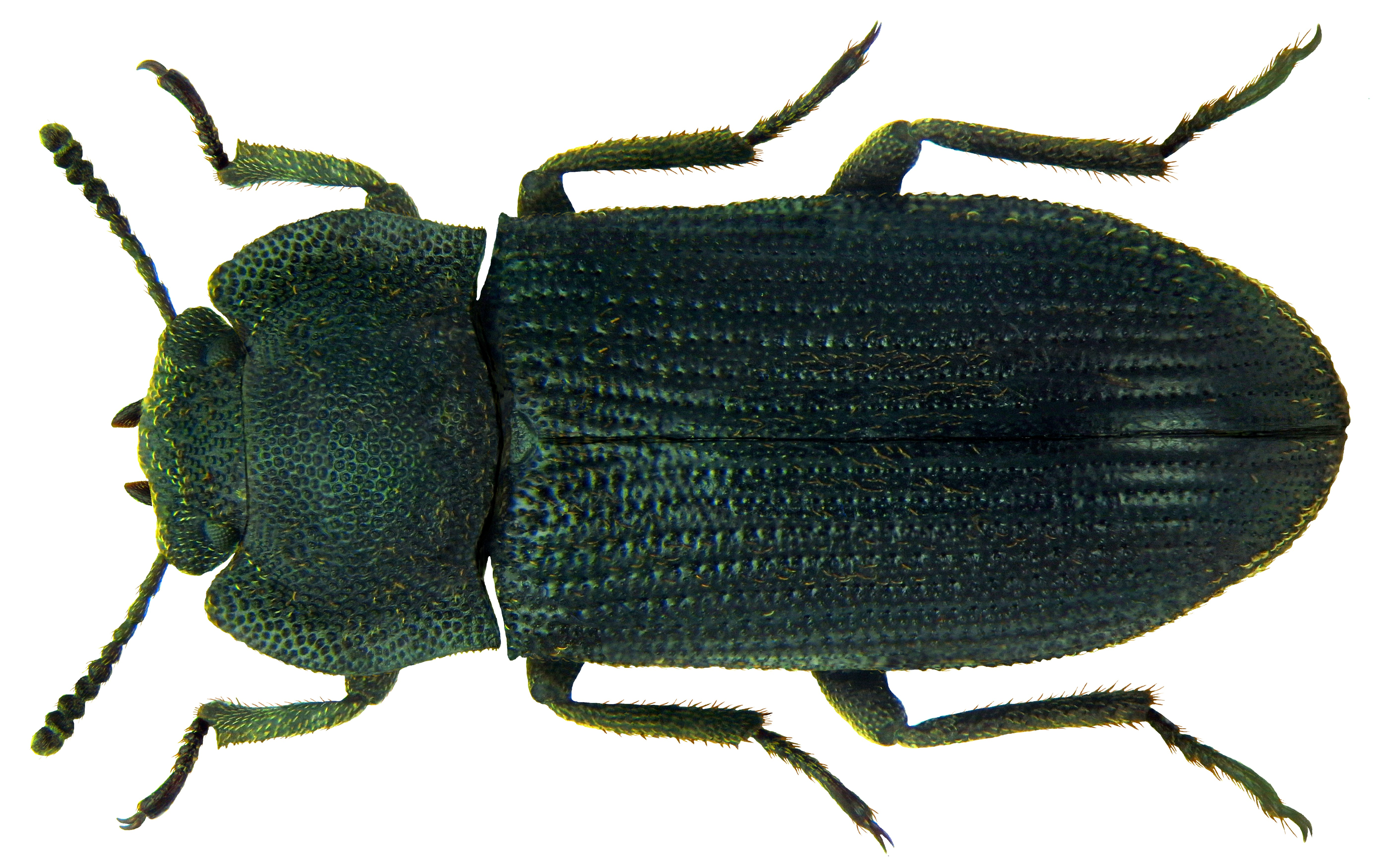
- Gonocephalum humeridens
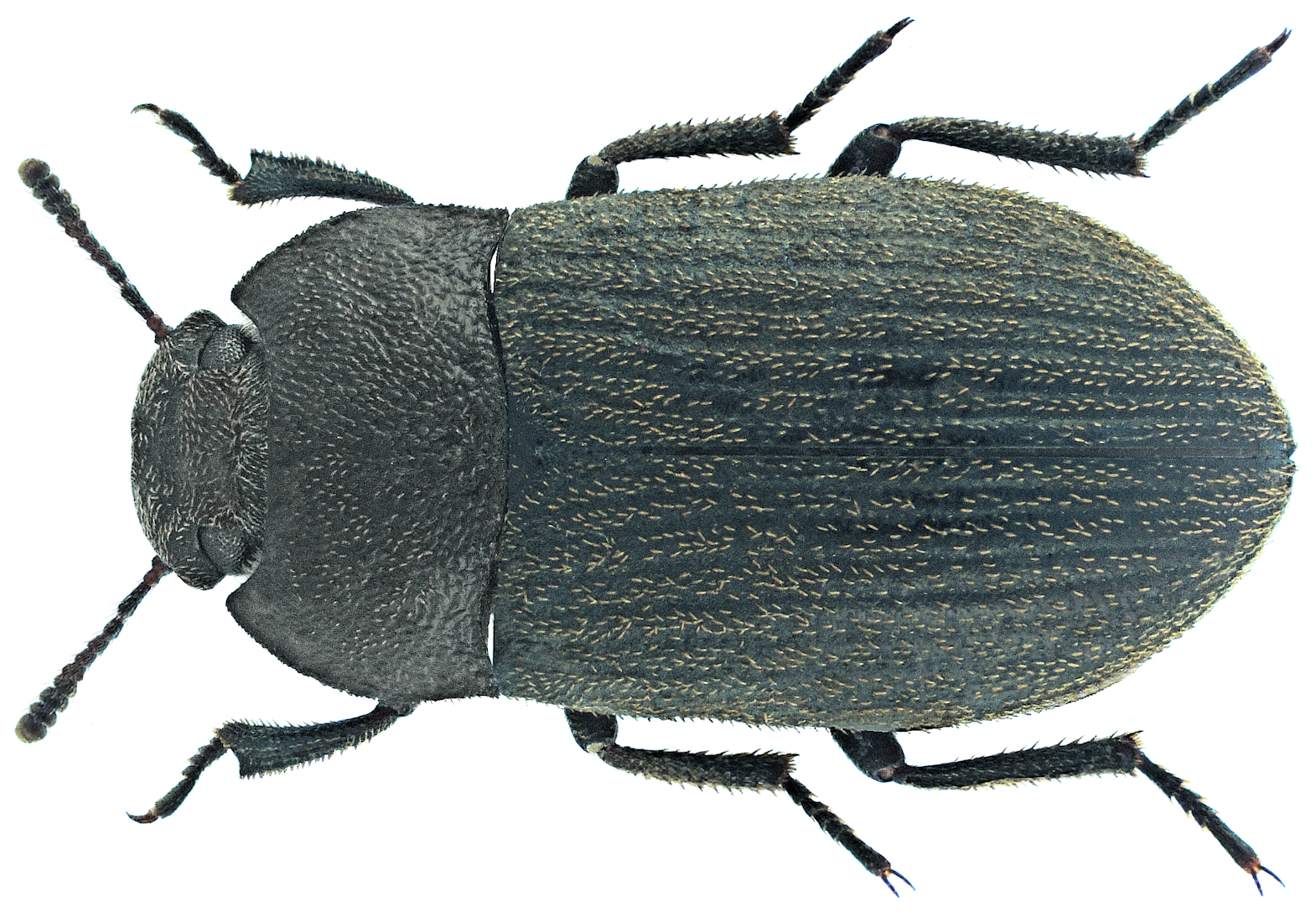
- Gonocephalum hoffmannseggi

Scientific classification
- Kingdom: Animalia
- Phylum: Arthropoda
- Class: Insecta
- Order: Coleoptera
- Suborder: Polyphaga
- Infraorder: Cucujiformia
- Family: Tenebrionidae
- Subfamily: Blaptinae
- Tribe: Opatrini
- Genus: Gonocephalum; Chevrolat, 1849

= Gonocephalum =

Genus of beetles

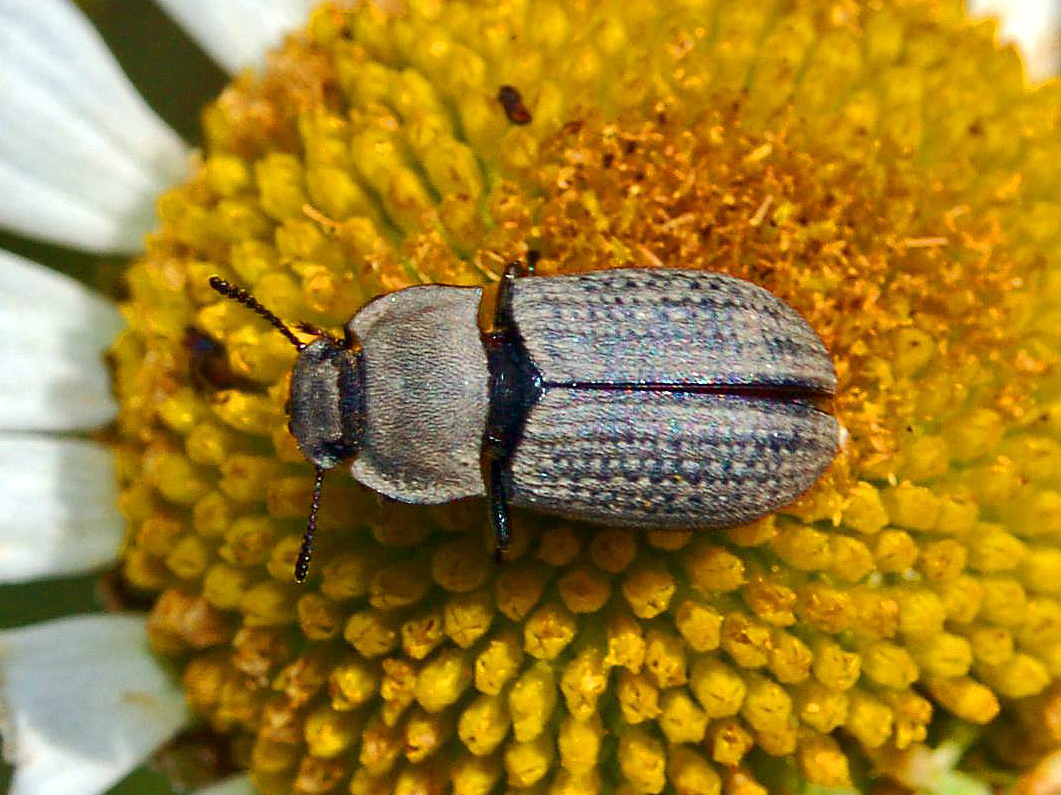
Gonocephalum cf. assimile

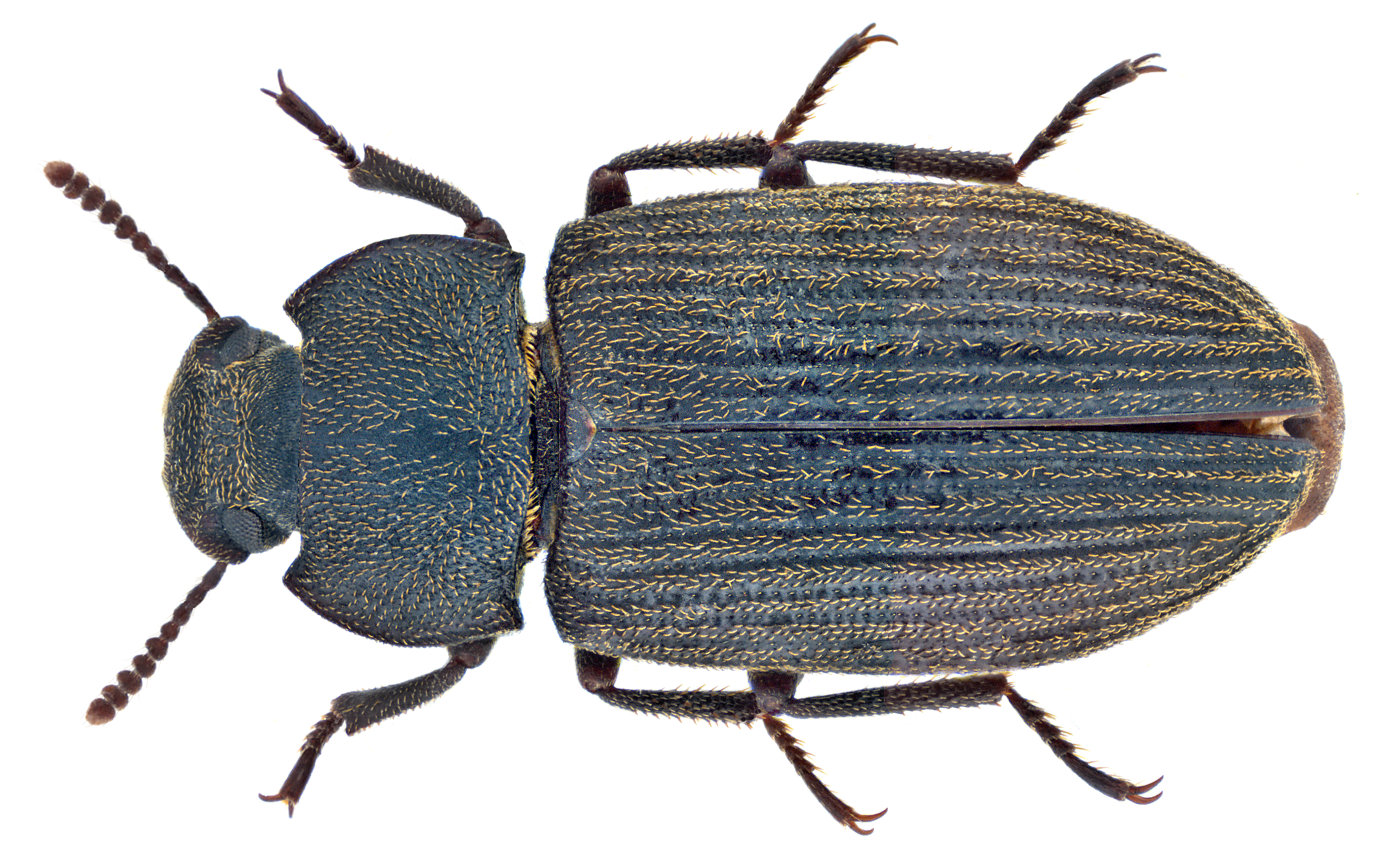
Gonocephalum rusticum

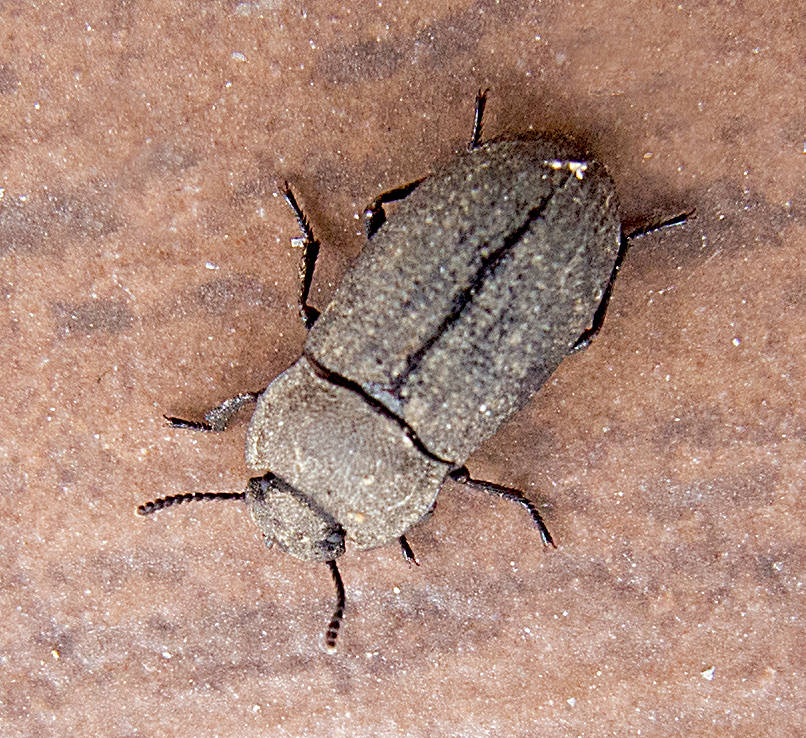
Gonocephalum granulatum pusillum, Bulgaria

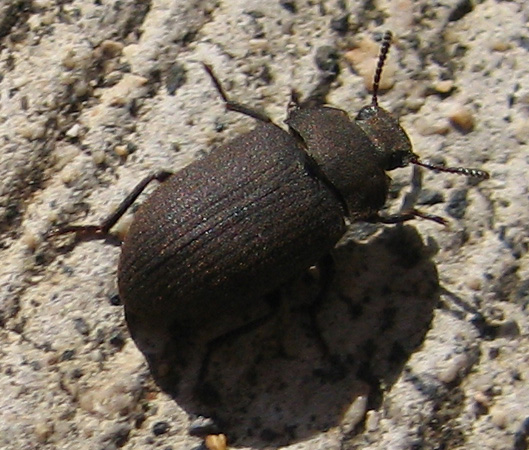
Gonocephalum adpressiforme

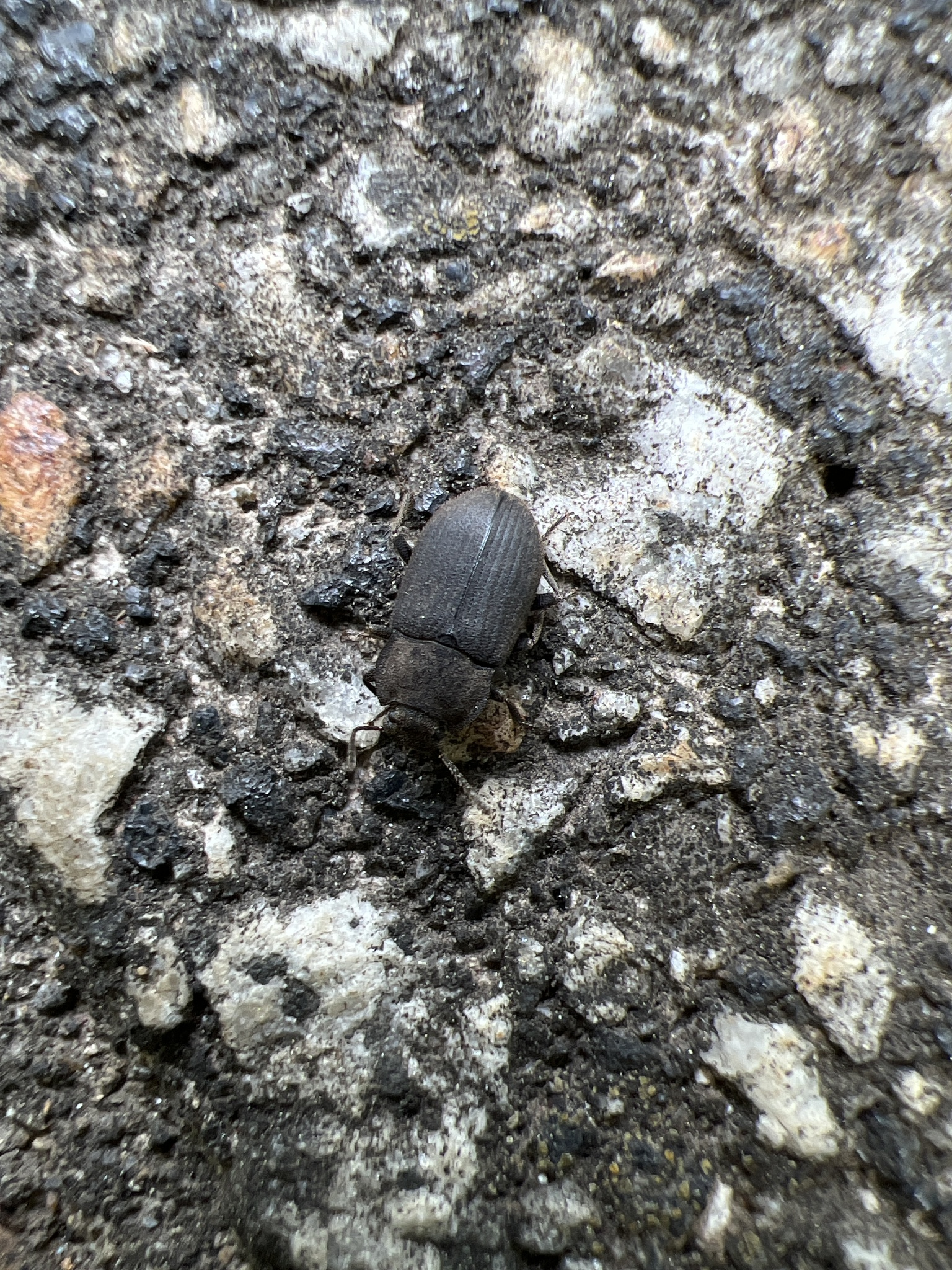
Gonocephalum coriaceum, Japan

Gonocephalum is a genus of darkling beetles (Tenebrionidae). Members of this genus are found worldwide on every continent except Antarctica.

This genus contains many spefirs with more than 350 described species.

== Description ==
Their bodies are quite elongated with the base of pronotum is usually slightly narrower than the base of elytra. The hind wings are developed.

== Species ==
These 364 species belong to the genus Gonocephalum:

- Gonocephalum aalbui Ferrer, 2000
- Gonocephalum abnormale Kaszab, 1952
- Gonocephalum acanthocnemis Gridelli, 1945
- Gonocephalum acoriaceum Chûjô, 1975
- Gonocephalum acuticolle Kaszab, 1952
- Gonocephalum adelaide (Blackburn, 1894)
- Gonocephalum adpressiforme Kaszab, 1951
- Gonocephalum adpressum (Germar, 1824)
- Gonocephalum aequale (Erichson, 1843)
- Gonocephalum aequatoriale (Blanchard, 1853)
- Gonocephalum aethiopicum (Ardoin, 1965)
- Gonocephalum affine (Billberg, 1815)
- Gonocephalum alaticolle (Fairmaire, 1893)
- Gonocephalum albertii Ferrer, 1995
- Gonocephalum alternatum Carter, 1915
- Gonocephalum alternicostis Gebien, 1910
- Gonocephalum alticola Chatanay, 1914
- Gonocephalum amplicollis Fairmaire, 1894
- Gonocephalum amplithorax (Fairmaire, 1894)
- Gonocephalum andamanense Kaszab, 1952
- Gonocephalum andrewesi Kaszab, 1952
- Gonocephalum angelicae Ferrer, 1995
- Gonocephalum angolense Erichson, 1843
- Gonocephalum angustatum Chevrolat, 1873
- Gonocephalum angusticolle (Gerstaecker, 1855)
- Gonocephalum annamita Chatanay, 1917
- Gonocephalum apterum Koch, 1955
- Gonocephalum ardoinicum Kaszab, 1972
- Gonocephalum arenarium (Fabricius, 1775)
- Gonocephalum arisi Reitter, 1905
- Gonocephalum asperatum Gebien, 1920
- Gonocephalum assimile (Küster, 1849)
- Gonocephalum aterrimum (Montrouzier, 1860)
- Gonocephalum australe Boisduval, 1835
- Gonocephalum balmeae Kaszab, 1952
- Gonocephalum bartolozzii Ferrer, 1995
- Gonocephalum batesi Ferrer, 2000
- Gonocephalum belli Kaszab, 1952
- Gonocephalum bengalense Kaszab, 1952
- Gonocephalum besnardi Kaszab, 1982
- Gonocephalum bigranulatum Kaszab, 1952
- Gonocephalum bilineatum (Walker, 1858)
- Gonocephalum bimaculatum Ferrer, 1995
- Gonocephalum binotatum Ardoin, 1967
- Gonocephalum birmanicum Kaszab, 1952
- Gonocephalum biroi Kaszab, 1952
- Gonocephalum biseriatum Kaszab, 1975
- Gonocephalum blairi (Gebien, 1922)
- Gonocephalum borosi Kaszab, 1952
- Gonocephalum brachelytra Kaszab, 1952
- Gonocephalum bradymeroides Chatanay, 1917
- Gonocephalum bremeri Ferrer, 1955
- Gonocephalum brenieri Chatanay, 1917
- Gonocephalum brevicolle Philippi, 1860
- Gonocephalum brevicorne Chatanay, 1917
- Gonocephalum brevisetosum Kaszab, 1952
- Gonocephalum brincki Ferrer, 2000
- Gonocephalum brittoni Kaszab, 1952
- Gonocephalum buitenzorgense Kaszab, 1952
- Gonocephalum caesum Steven, 1829
- Gonocephalum calcaripes (Karsch, 1881)
- Gonocephalum calvulum (Olliff, 1889)
- Gonocephalum camerunense Gridelli, 1945
- Gonocephalum carpentariae (Blackburn, 1894)
- Gonocephalum catenulatum (Fairmaire, 1896)
- Gonocephalum celebense Kaszab, 1952
- Gonocephalum charbonnelae Ferrer, 2004
- Gonocephalum chinense Gebien, 1910
- Gonocephalum civicum Kaszab, 1952
- Gonocephalum clavigerum Kaszab, 1980
- Gonocephalum clypeatum Gebien, 1920
- Gonocephalum coarcticolle Kaszab, 1952
- Gonocephalum coenosum Kaszab, 1952
- Gonocephalum compressum Ferrer, 1995
- Gonocephalum condamini Ardoin, 1963
- Gonocephalum confusum Ferrer, 2000
- Gonocephalum consobrinum Blair, 1923
- Gonocephalum contractum Gerstaecker, 1871
- Gonocephalum controversum Gridelli, 1948
- Gonocephalum cookae Kaszab, 1952
- Gonocephalum corallinum Kaszab, 1961
- Gonocephalum coriaceum Motschulsky, 1858
- Gonocephalum costatum (Brullé, 1832)
- Gonocephalum cowardense Blackburn, 1894
- Gonocephalum crassepunctatum Kaszab, 1952
- Gonocephalum cristovallense (Montrouzier, 1855)
- Gonocephalum csikii Kaszab, 1952
- Gonocephalum curiosum Kaszab, 1952
- Gonocephalum curlettii Ferrer, 2000
- Gonocephalum curvicolle Reitter, 1889
- Gonocephalum dasiforme Kaszab, 1952
- Gonocephalum deliense Kaszab, 1952
- Gonocephalum demeteri Ferrer, 1995
- Gonocephalum dentipes Kaszab, 1952
- Gonocephalum dentitibia Gebien, 1920
- Gonocephalum depressum (Fabricius, 1801)
- Gonocephalum dermestoides (Gerstaecker, 1871)
- Gonocephalum deserticola Ferrer, 2000
- Gonocephalum devylderi Ferrer, 1995
- Gonocephalum dilatatum (Wollaston, 1854)
- Gonocephalum dorsogranosum (Fairmaire, 1896)
- Gonocephalum dravidum Bremer et Ferrer, 1992
- Gonocephalum dubium (Arrow, 1900)
- Gonocephalum duplegranulatum Gridelli, 1948
- Gonocephalum elderi (Blackburn, 1892)
- Gonocephalum elegans Chatanay, 1917
- Gonocephalum elytrale Kaszab, 1952
- Gonocephalum endroedii Kaszab, 1952
- Gonocephalum ermischi Kaszab, 1960
- Gonocephalum espagnoli Kaszab, 1965
- Gonocephalum fallaciosum Gridelli, 1948
- Gonocephalum feae Gebien, 1920
- Gonocephalum fernandezi Ferrer, 2004
- Gonocephalum ficifolium Chûjô, 1995
- Gonocephalum ficifoliu , M. T. Chûjô, 1994.
- Gonocephalum folini Ferrer, 1995
- Gonocephalum formosanum Gebien, 1913
- Gonocephalum fortidens (Reitter, 1915)
- Gonocephalum foveicolle Kaszab, 1952
- Gonocephalum foveoseriatum Chatanay, 1914
- Gonocephalum frederici Ferrer, 1995
- Gonocephalum freudei Kaszab, 1960
- Gonocephalum freyi Kaszab, 1952
- Gonocephalum fuscosetosum Chatanay, 1917
- Gonocephalum gallagheri Ferrer, 1997
- Gonocephalum gebieni Gridelli, 1945
- Gonocephalum gebienianum Kaszab, 1952
- Gonocephalum geneirotundum Ren, 1998
- Gonocephalum germari Ferrer, 2000
- Gonocephalum gerstaeckeri Ferrer, 1995
- Gonocephalum gestroi Gebien, 1920
- Gonocephalum girardi Ferrer, 1995
- Gonocephalum giraudini Ardoin, 1965
- Gonocephalum gracile (Bates, 1879)
- Gonocephalum granohispidum Kolbe, 1897
- Gonocephalum granosum Gebien, 1921
- Gonocephalum granulatipenne Kaszab, 1978
- Gonocephalum granulatum (Fabricius, 1791)
- Gonocephalum granulipenne Gridelli, 1945
- Gonocephalum greensladei Kaszab, 1980
- Gonocephalum gridellianum Kaszab, 1952
- Gonocephalum gridellii Koch, 1953
- Gonocephalum grimmi Ferrer, 1995
- Gonocephalum griseovittatum Gridelli, 1940
- Gonocephalum griseovittatum lomii, Ferrer, 2000
- Gonocephalum gruveli Ferrer, 2004
- Gonocephalum guerryi Chatanay, 1917
- Gonocephalum guignoti Kaszab, 1960
- Gonocephalum gustafssoni Ferrer, 1995
- Gonocephalum hackeri Carter, 1928
- Gonocephalum hadroide (Fairmaire, 1888)
- Gonocephalum hasticolle Chatanay, 1917
- Gonocephalum hauschildi Kaszab, 1952
- Gonocephalum helaeoides Kaszab, 1952
- Gonocephalum helferi Kaszab, 1952
- Gonocephalum helopioide (Fairmaire, 1894)
- Gonocephalum hiekei Ferrer, 1995
- Gonocephalum himalayense Kaszab, 1952
- Gonocephalum hingstoni Kaszab, 1952
- Gonocephalum hintoni Kaszab, 1952
- Gonocephalum hiranoi Akita et Masomoto, 2003
- Gonocephalum hispidocostatum (Fairmaire, 1883)
- Gonocephalum hispidulum Kaszab, 1952
- Gonocephalum hoffmannseggi (Steven, 1829)
- Gonocephalum horni Kaszab, 1952
- Gonocephalum humeridens (Fairmaire, 1883)
- Gonocephalum imitator Ferrer, 1995
- Gonocephalum impictum (Fairmaire, 1849)
- Gonocephalum impressiceps Kaszab, 1952
- Gonocephalum impressiusculum Gebien, 1920
- Gonocephalum inaequale Gridelli, 1945
- Gonocephalum incisum (Blanchard, 1853)
- Gonocephalum indictum Ferrer, 1995
- Gonocephalum indicum (Kaszab, 1952)
- Gonocephalum inquinatum (Sahlberg, 1923)
- Gonocephalum insulana Ardoin, 1965
- Gonocephalum insulana halsteadi, Ferrer, 2000
- Gonocephalum insulanum (Olliff, 1887)
- Gonocephalum interruptum Gridelli, 1948
- Gonocephalum irroratum Fauvel, 1867
- Gonocephalum japanum Motschulsky, 1860
- Gonocephalum javae Ferrer, 2010
- Gonocephalum javanicum Kaszab, 1952
- Gonocephalum joliveti Ardoin, 1965
- Gonocephalum juanense Ferrer, 2000
- Gonocephalum kalidii Skopin, 1964
- Gonocephalum kandaharicum Kaszab, 1960
- Gonocephalum karakorumense Kaszab, 1961
- Gonocephalum karatalica Skopin, 1966
- Gonocephalum kaszabi Ferrer, 1995
- Gonocephalum kazenasi Skopin, 1961
- Gonocephalum kempsteri Ferrer, 2000
- Gonocephalum kenyense Ardoin, 1967
- Gonocephalum klapperichi Kaszab, 1952
- Gonocephalum kochi Kaszab, 1952
- Gonocephalum kolbei Gridelli, 1945
- Gonocephalum kondoi Masumoto, 1983
- Gonocephalum konoi Kaszab, 1952
- Gonocephalum koreanum Kaszab, 1952
- Gonocephalum kuehnelti Kaszab, 1961
- Gonocephalum kuluanum Kaszab, 1952
- Gonocephalum kulzeri Kaszab, 1952
- Gonocephalum kuntzeni Kaszab, 1952
- Gonocephalum labriquei Ferrer, 2010
- Gonocephalum laosense Kaszab, 1952
- Gonocephalum laticolle Gebien, 1910
- Gonocephalum lefranci (Fairmaire, 1863)
- Gonocephalum lesnei Ferrer, 1995
- Gonocephalum lewisi Blair, 1922
- Gonocephalum litorale Chatanay, 1914
- Gonocephalum lomii n. sp. Gridelli det.") (in litt.) Mojo Atschavo,
- Gonocephalum longitarse Kaszab, 1952
- Gonocephalum longulum Gebien, 1911
- Gonocephalum lucidicolle Ardoin, 1965
- Gonocephalum macleay Blackburn, 1907
- Gonocephalum macrophthalmum Kaszab, 1952
- Gonocephalum madagascariense Chatanay, 1914
- Gonocephalum madurense Kaszab, 1952
- Gonocephalum malayanum Gebien, 1935
- Gonocephalum malcyi Ardoin, 1966
- Gonocephalum marani Kaszab, 1952
- Gonocephalum mariei Chatanay, 1914
- Gonocephalum martensi Kaszab, 1977
- Gonocephalum martini Ferrer, 1995
- Gonocephalum marylinneae Ferrer, 2000
- Gonocephalum massauense Gridelli, 1945
- Gonocephalum mastersi (MacLeay, 1872)
- Gonocephalum medvedevi Kaszab, 1965
- Gonocephalum merensi Uyttenboogaart, 1929
- Gonocephalum merkli Ferrer, 2000
- Gonocephalum mesopotamicum Blair, 1923
- Gonocephalum meyricky Blackburn, 1894
- Gonocephalum micantipenne Fairmaire, 1893
- Gonocephalum michaelseni Gebien, 1920
- Gonocephalum minusculum (Fairmaire, 1894)
- Gonocephalum misellum Blackburn, 1907
- Gonocephalum miyakense Nakane, 1963
- Gonocephalum modestum (Reiche, 1847)
- Gonocephalum moluccanum (Blanchard, 1853)
- Gonocephalum moraguesi Ferrer, 2000
- Gonocephalum muelleri Gridelli, 1945
- Gonocephalum mysorense Kaszab, 1952
- Gonocephalum neoblairi Iwan, 2010
- Gonocephalum nepalicum Kaszab, 1973
- Gonocephalum niloticum Ardoin, 1965
- Gonocephalum novaecaledoniae Kaszab, 1982
- Gonocephalum nyassae Ferrer, 2000
- Gonocephalum obenbergeri Kaszab, 1952
- Gonocephalum oblitum (Wollaston, 1864)
- Gonocephalum oblongum (Fabricius, 1801)
- Gonocephalum obscurum (Küster, 1849)
- Gonocephalum oceanicum Kaszab, 1985
- Gonocephalum oculare Kaszab, 1952
- Gonocephalum okinawanum Chujô, 1963
- Gonocephalum omoense Ardoin, 1967
- Gonocephalum opacum Walker, 1871
- Gonocephalum outreyi Chatanay, 1917
- Gonocephalum papuanum Gebien, 1920
- Gonocephalum papulosum (Fairmaire, 1896)
- Gonocephalum parcesetosum Kaszab, 1952
- Gonocephalum patricium Kaszab, 1952
- Gonocephalum patrizii Gridelli, 1948
- Gonocephalum patruele (Erichson, 1843)
- Gonocephalum peguanum Kaszab, 1952
- Gonocephalum peregrinum Kolbe, 1902
- Gonocephalum perplexum (Lucas, 1849)
- Gonocephalum persimile (Lewis, 1894)
- Gonocephalum philippinense Kaszab, 1952
- Gonocephalum pilosa Ferrer, 2000
- Gonocephalum planicolle Kaszab, 1952
- Gonocephalum platipenne Kaszab, 1960
- Gonocephalum podagrarium (Kaszab, 1939)
- Gonocephalum politum Ferrer, 2000
- Gonocephalum pottsi Kulzer, 1957
- Gonocephalum prolixum (Erichson, 1843)
- Gonocephalum pseudopubens Kaszab, 1952
- Gonocephalum pubens (Marseul, 1876)
- Gonocephalum pubescens (Palisot de Beauvois, 1821)
- Gonocephalum pubiferum Reitter, 1904
- Gonocephalum pulverulentum Olivier, 1811
- Gonocephalum pygmaeum (Steven, 1829)
- Gonocephalum rastellii Ferrer, 1997
- Gonocephalum recticolle Motschulsky, 1866
- Gonocephalum recurvum Gebien, 1920
- Gonocephalum remedellii Gridelli, 1945
- Gonocephalum reticulatum Motschulsky, 1854
- Gonocephalum rileyi Kaszab, 1952
- Gonocephalum rondoni Kaszab, 1972
- Gonocephalum roseni Kaszab, 1952
- Gonocephalum rostratum Bremer et Ferrer, 2002
- Gonocephalum rotundatum Gridelli, 1940
- Gonocephalum royi Ardoin, 1961
- Gonocephalum rugatulum (Fairmaire, 1893)
- Gonocephalum rusticum (Olivier, 1811)
- Gonocephalum sauteri Kaszab, 1952
- Gonocephalum sawadai Masumoto, 1985
- Gonocephalum schelpi Bremer et Ferrer, 1992
- Gonocephalum schneideri Reitter, 1898
- Gonocephalum schusteri Kaszab, 1952
- Gonocephalum sculptithorax Gridelli, 1948
- Gonocephalum scutellare (Perty, 1831)
- Gonocephalum semipatruele Kaszab, 1952
- Gonocephalum senkakuense Chujô, 1973
- Gonocephalum seriatum (Boisduval, 1835)
- Gonocephalum sericeum (Baudi, 1875)
- Gonocephalum setulosum (Faldermann, 1837)
- Gonocephalum sexuale (Marseul, 1876)
- Gonocephalum shimoganum Kaszab, 1952
- Gonocephalum sibuyanum Kaszab, 1952
- Gonocephalum sikkimense Kaszab, 1952
- Gonocephalum simplex (Fabricius, 1801)
- Gonocephalum simplicipes Gridelli, 1948
- Gonocephalum simulatrix (Fairmaire, 1891)
- Gonocephalum sinicum Reichardt, 1936
- Gonocephalum soederbomi Ferrer, 2010
- Gonocephalum somalica (Ardoin, 1965)
- Gonocephalum somalicum Gridelli, 1945
- Gonocephalum soricinum (Reiche et Saulcy, 1857)
- Gonocephalum spangleri Kaszab, 1980
- Gonocephalum spinicolle (Fairmaire, 1896)
- Gonocephalum stevensi Kaszab, 1952
- Gonocephalum stoeckleini Kaszab, 1952
- Gonocephalum strangulatum (Fairmaire, 1888)
- Gonocephalum strigosum (Reiche, 1850)
- Gonocephalum subcontractum Gridelli, 1945
- Gonocephalum subrugulosum Reitter, 1887
- Gonocephalum subsetosum (Kolbe, 1883)
- Gonocephalum subspinosum (Fairmaire, 1894)
- Gonocephalum subsulcatum (Reiche, 1850)
- Gonocephalum swazilandense Ferrer, 1995
- Gonocephalum szekessyi Kaszab, 1952
- Gonocephalum takara Nakane, 1963
- Gonocephalum tellinii Gridelli, 1945
- Gonocephalum tenasserimicum Kaszab, 1952
- Gonocephalum tenuicorne Kaszab, 1952
- Gonocephalum tenuipes Kaszab, 1952
- Gonocephalum terminale Reichardt, 1936
- Gonocephalum thailandicum Kaszab et Chujô, 1966
- Gonocephalum tibetanum Kaszab, 1952
- Gonocephalum titschacki Kaszab, 1952
- Gonocephalum tomentosum (Walker, 1871)
- Gonocephalum tonkinense Kaszab, 1952
- Gonocephalum topali Kaszab 1975
- Gonocephalum torridum (Champion, 1894)
- Gonocephalum triste Ferrer, 2000
- Gonocephalum tschilianum Kaszab, 1952
- Gonocephalum tuberculatum (Hope, 1831)
- Gonocephalum tuberculiferum Ferrer, 1995
- Gonocephalum uhligi Ferrer, 2002
- Gonocephalum ulugurense Ardoin, 1976
- Gonocephalum uniseriatum Kaszab, 1952
- Gonocephalum vagum (Steven, 1829)
- Gonocephalum validum Ferrer, 2000
- Gonocephalum veigae Koch, 1956
- Gonocephalum verrucosum (Fairmaire, 1849)
- Gonocephalum vientianeum Kaszab, 1972
- Gonocephalum villiersi Gridelli, 1948
- Gonocephalum walkeri Champion, 1894
- Gonocephalum wau Kaszab, 1970
- Gonocephalum wittmeri Kaszab, 1975
- Gonocephalum woynarovichi Kaszab, 1973
- Gonocephalum wui Ren, 1995
- Gonocephalum zambesense Ferrer, 1995
- Gonocephalum zoltani Iwan, 2010
