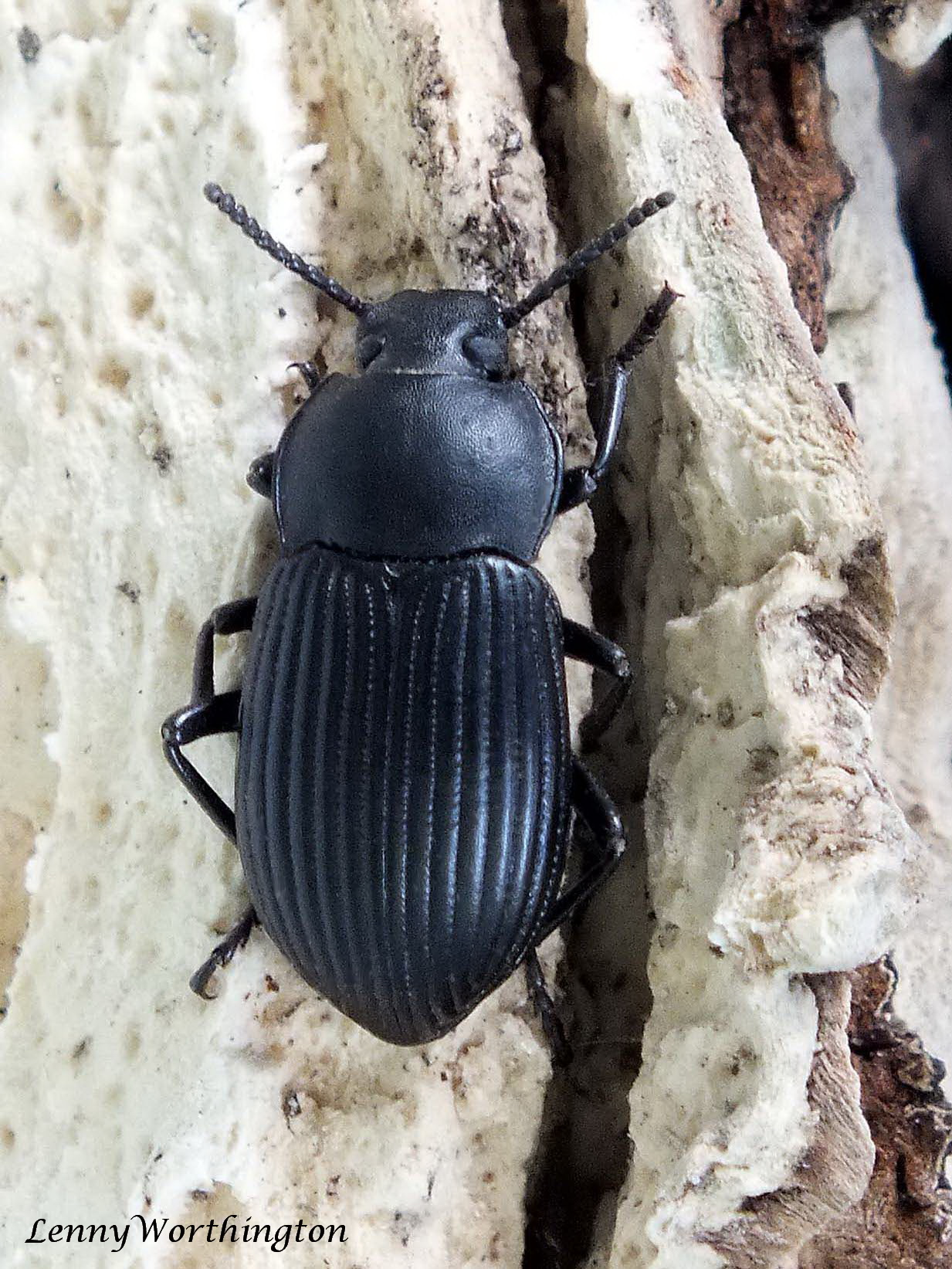

Scientific classification
- Kingdom: Animalia
- Phylum: Arthropoda
- Class: Insecta
- Order: Coleoptera
- Suborder: Polyphaga
- Infraorder: Cucujiformia
- Family: Tenebrionidae
- Subfamily: Blaptinae
- Tribe: Opatrini
- Genus: Gonocephalum
- Species: G. depressum

Binomial name
- Gonocephalum depressum (Fabricius 1801)

Synonyms
- Opatrum depressum Fabricius, 1801; Hopatrum depressum Fabricius, 1801; Gonocephalum depressum (Fabricius, 1801); Opatrum contrahens Walker, 1858; Hopatrum contrahens Walker, 1858; Gonocephalum contrahens (Walker, 1858)

= Gonocephalum depressum =

Species of beetle

Gonocephalum depressum is a species of darkling beetle. The species is widespread in South Asian and South East Asian countries such as, India, Bhutan, Nepal, Pakistan, Indonesia, Laos, Philippines, Sri Lanka, Myanmar, Taiwan, Afghanistan and China.

In Kerala, India, the larva of the beetle is considered as a pest of sweet potato. The seeds of Aeginetia pedunculata are known to attack by the adults where infestations are common during October to November. It is also a predator of the pest Chilo partellus.

== Gallery ==
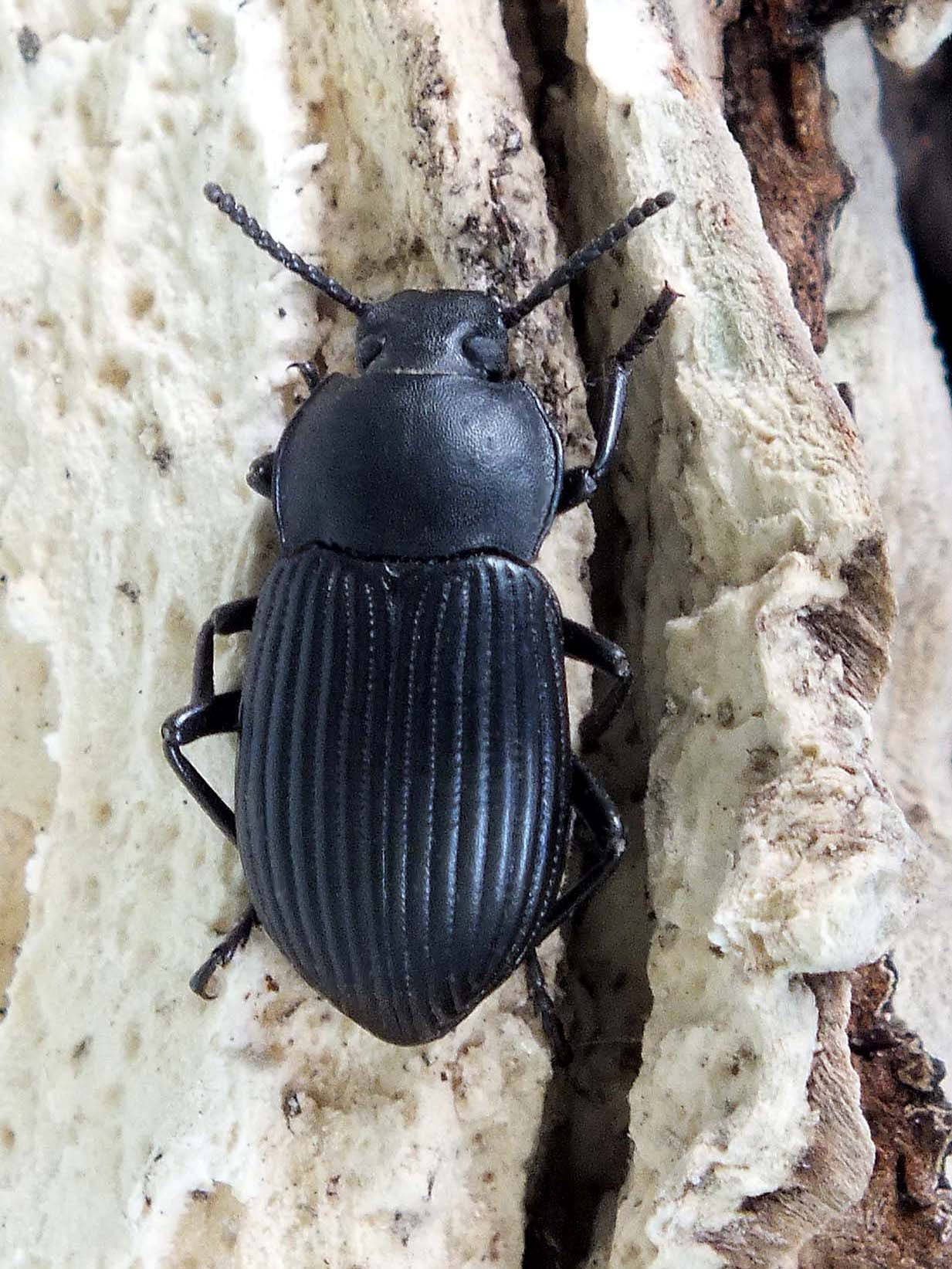

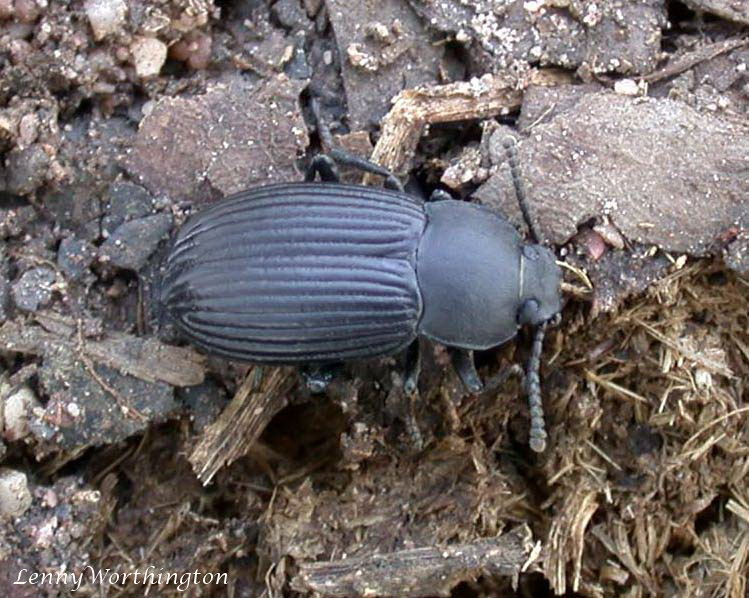
