= Gonocephalum sericeum =

Scientific classification
- Kingdom: Animalia
- Phylum: Arthropoda
- Clade: Pancrustacea
- Class: Insecta
- Order: Coleoptera
- Suborder: Polyphaga
- Infraorder: Cucujiformia
- Family: Tenebrionidae
- Genus: Gonocephalum
- Species: G. sericeum

Binomial name
- Gonocephalum sericeum (Baudi di Selve, 1875)

Species of beetles

Gonocephalum sericeum is a species in the darkling beetle family Tenebrionidae. It is native to North Africa and the Middle East, and is adventive in North America. It has been established in California since at least 1980.

Gonocephalum sericeum is a small beetle, 3.5–3.8 mm, brown or nearly black. It is similar in appearance and has been confused with Blapstinus dilatatus, which may co-occur in sandy soil habitats.
