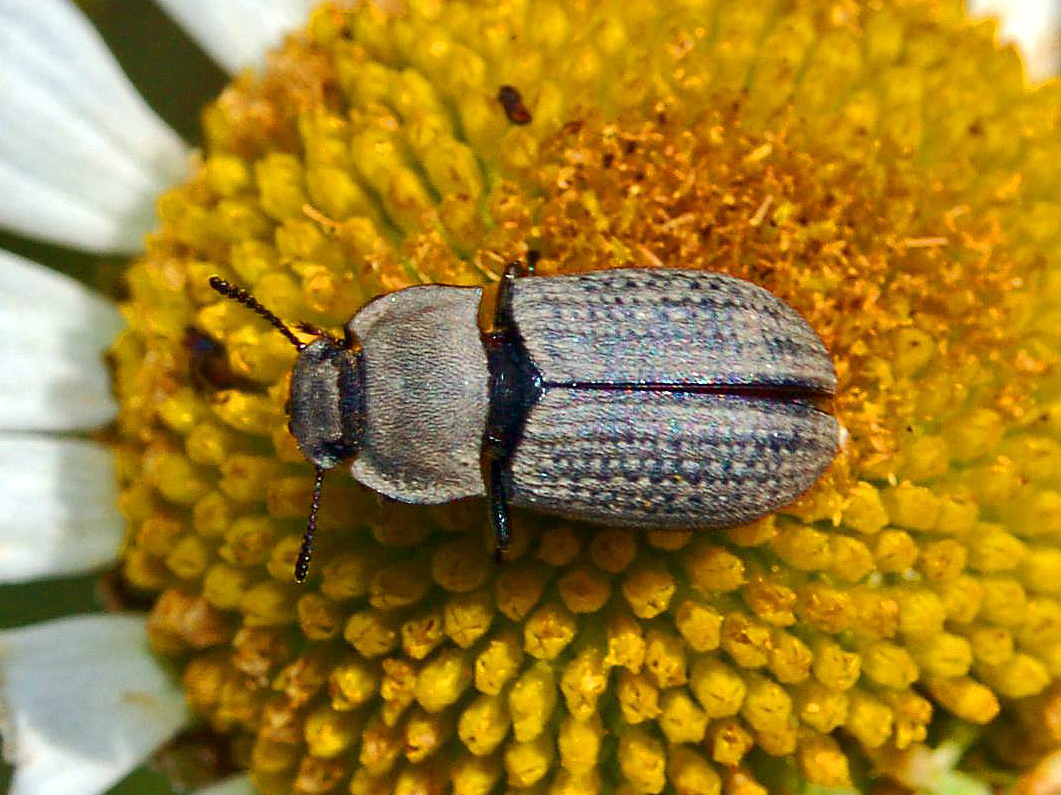
- Gonocephalum cf. assimile

Scientific classification
- Domain: Eukaryota
- Kingdom: Animalia
- Phylum: Arthropoda
- Class: Insecta
- Order: Coleoptera
- Suborder: Polyphaga
- Infraorder: Cucujiformia
- Family: Tenebrionidae
- Subfamily: Blaptinae
- Tribe: Opatrini
- Genus: Gonocephalum
- Species: G. assimile

Binomial name
- Gonocephalum assimile (Küster, 1849)

Synonyms
- Opatrum assimile Küster, 1849; Hopatrum assimile (Küster, 1849)

= Gonocephalum assimile =

Species of beetle

Gonocephalum assimile is a species of darkling beetle in the family Tenebrionidae.

== Distribution ==
This species is present in Italy (incl. Sardinia and Sicily) and in San Marino.
