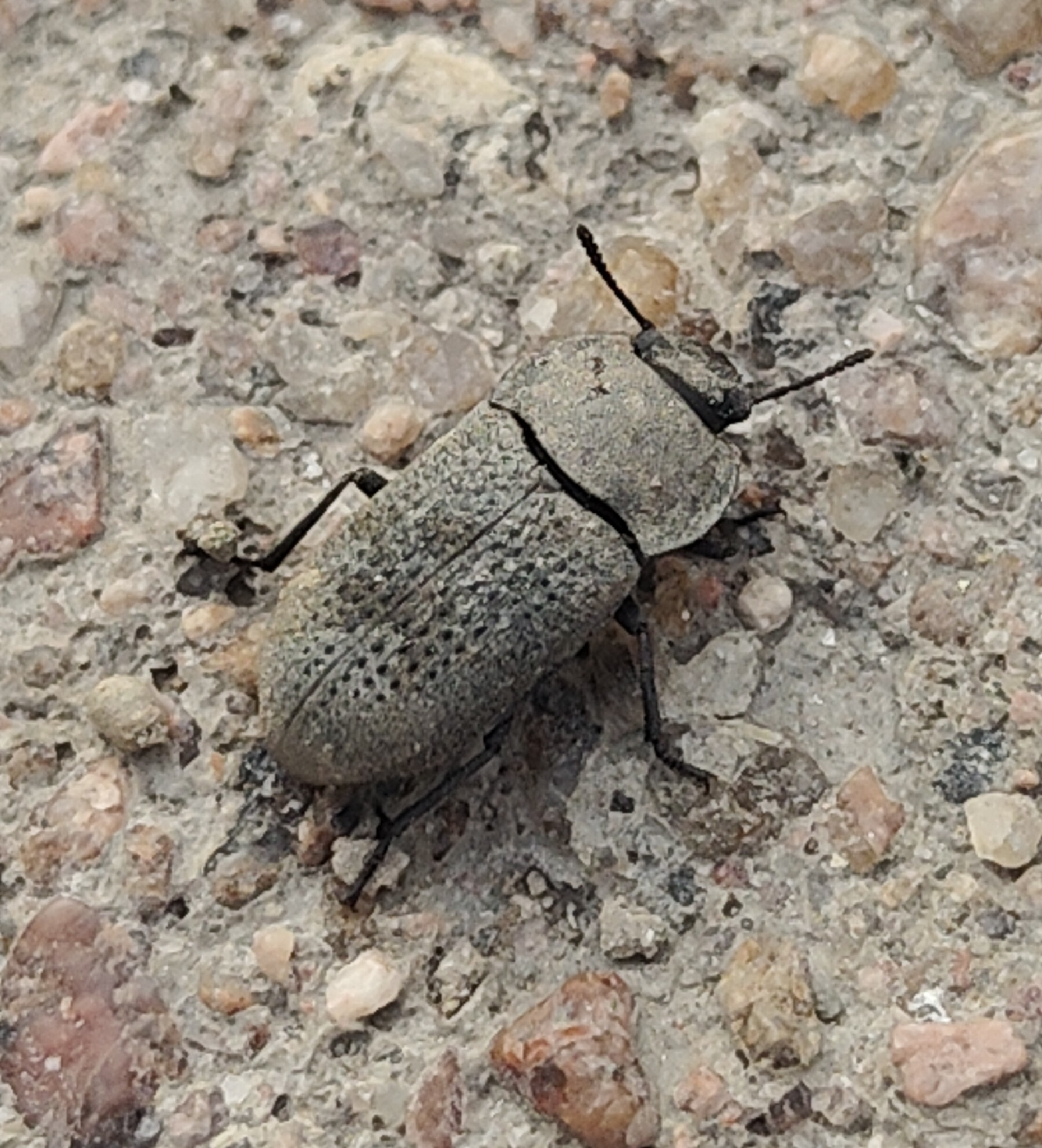

Scientific classification
- Kingdom: Animalia
- Phylum: Arthropoda
- Class: Insecta
- Order: Coleoptera
- Suborder: Polyphaga
- Infraorder: Cucujiformia
- Family: Tenebrionidae
- Subfamily: Blaptinae
- Tribe: Opatrini
- Genus: Gonocephalum
- Species: G. dorsogranosum

Binomial name
- Gonocephalum dorsogranosum (Fairmaire, 1896)

Synonyms
- Hopatrum dorsogranosum Fairmare, 1896

= Gonocephalum dorsogranosum =

Species of beetle

Gonocephalum dorsogranosum is a species of darkling beetle in the family Tenebrionidae. It is found in India.

This species is designated as a pest of the chilli, Capsicum annuum.

== Description ==
The elytra is only internally with flat tubercule rows, which become much smaller towards the sides. This species is very similar to Gonocephalum catenulatum but the sides are less widely margined and less raised.
