= Moronoserica squamulatoides =

Scientific classification
- Kingdom: Animalia
- Phylum: Arthropoda
- Class: Insecta
- Order: Coleoptera
- Suborder: Polyphaga
- Infraorder: Scarabaeiformia
- Family: Scarabaeidae
- Genus: Moronoserica
- Species: M. squamulatoides

Binomial name
- Moronoserica squamulatoides Ahrens, Lukic & Liu, 2023

Species of beetle

Moronoserica squamulatoides is a species of beetle of the family Scarabaeidae. It is found in Thailand.

== Description ==
Adults reach a length of about 8.3–8.4 mm. They have a brown, oval body. The scutellum is lighter brown and the frons and pronotum have a greenish shine. The dorsal surface is dull (although the labroclypeus is shiny) and, except for the center of the elytral intervals, almost evenly and densely covered with fine, white setae.

== Etymology ==
The species name is derived from the combined words squamulatus (meaning with scales) and the Greek suffix -oides and refers to the similarity to Moronoserica squamulata.
