= Moronoserica helferi =

Scientific classification
- Kingdom: Animalia
- Phylum: Arthropoda
- Class: Insecta
- Order: Coleoptera
- Suborder: Polyphaga
- Infraorder: Scarabaeiformia
- Family: Scarabaeidae
- Genus: Moronoserica
- Species: M. helferi

Binomial name
- Moronoserica helferi (Bohacz & Ahrens, 2020)

Synonyms
- Microserica helferi Bohacz & Ahrens, 2020

Species of beetle

Moronoserica helferi is a species of beetle of the family Scarabaeidae. It is found in Myanmar.

== Description ==
Adults reach a length of about 5.4–5.6 mm. They have a yellowish brown, oval body. The frons, small spots on the elytral intervals, and two smaller spots on each side of the pronotum are darker brown with a greenish shine. The dorsal surface is dull (but the labroclypeus is shiny) and almost evenly and moderately densely covered with small white setae. The dark spots are glabrous.

== Etymology ==
The species name is derived from the name of its collector, Jan Vilém Helfer.
