= Moronoserica ginae =

Scientific classification
- Kingdom: Animalia
- Phylum: Arthropoda
- Class: Insecta
- Order: Coleoptera
- Suborder: Polyphaga
- Infraorder: Scarabaeiformia
- Family: Scarabaeidae
- Genus: Moronoserica
- Species: M. ginae

Binomial name
- Moronoserica ginae (Bohacz & Ahrens, 2020)

Synonyms
- Microserica ginae Bohacz & Ahrens, 2020

Species of beetle

Moronoserica ginae is a species of beetle of the family Scarabaeidae. It is found in Laos.

== Description ==
Adults reach a length of about 7 mm. They have a brown, oval body. The striae of the elytra and the scutellum are yellowish brown, while the frons and pronotum are dark brown with a greenish shine. The dorsal surface is dull (but the labroclypeus is shiny) and almost evenly and moderately densely covered with minute setae, with white, robust, erect setae on the elytra.

== Etymology ==
The species name is derived from the name of the dog of one of the authors, Gina.
