= Moronoserica geberbauer =

Scientific classification
- Kingdom: Animalia
- Phylum: Arthropoda
- Class: Insecta
- Order: Coleoptera
- Suborder: Polyphaga
- Infraorder: Scarabaeiformia
- Family: Scarabaeidae
- Genus: Moronoserica
- Species: M. geberbauer

Binomial name
- Moronoserica geberbauer (Ahrens, 2004)

Synonyms
- Microserica geberbauer Ahrens, 2004

Species of beetle

Moronoserica geberbauer is a species of beetle of the family Scarabaeidae. It is found in Thailand.

== Description ==
Adults reach a length of about 4.8–5.3 mm. They have a reddish dark brown, oval body. The frons and two large spots on the pronotum are dark with a greenish lustre, while the labroclypeus, legs, and elytra are yellowish, the latter with the margins and odd intervals dark. The dorsal surface is dull, partly slightly iridescent and with the labroclypeus strongly shiny. The body surface is almost glabrous, but the punctures with minute setae only. The elytra also have a few, moderately long and fine setae.

== Etymology ==
The species is named after Hans and Wilhelm Geberbauer.
