= Moronoserica banmethout =

Scientific classification
- Kingdom: Animalia
- Phylum: Arthropoda
- Class: Insecta
- Order: Coleoptera
- Suborder: Polyphaga
- Infraorder: Scarabaeiformia
- Family: Scarabaeidae
- Genus: Moronoserica
- Species: M. banmethout

Binomial name
- Moronoserica banmethout Ahrens, Lukic & Liu, 2023

Species of beetle

Moronoserica banmethout is a species of beetle of the family Scarabaeidae. It is found in Vietnam.

== Description ==
Adults reach a length of about 6.4 mm. They have a yellowish brown, oval body. The elytra, pronotum and frons with smaller, irregular but symmetric dark spots and part of the head and pronotum with a greenish shine. The rest of the surface is dull (except for the labroclypeus, which is shiny). The dorsal surface is glabrous.

== Etymology ==
The species name is derived from the type locality of the species, BanMe Thout.
