= Moronoserica lineata =

Scientific classification
- Kingdom: Animalia
- Phylum: Arthropoda
- Clade: Pancrustacea
- Class: Insecta
- Order: Coleoptera
- Suborder: Polyphaga
- Infraorder: Scarabaeiformia
- Family: Scarabaeidae
- Genus: Moronoserica
- Species: M. lineata

Binomial name
- Moronoserica lineata (Moser, 1915)

Synonyms
- Microserica lineata Moser, 1915

Species of beetle

Moronoserica lineata is a species of beetle of the family Scarabaeidae. It is found in Myanmar and Thailand.

== Description ==
Adults reach a length of about 5.7–6 mm. They have a yellowish brown, oval body. The frons and a median spot on the pronotum are dark with a greenish lustre. The dorsal surface is dull (except for the shiny labroclypeus) and almost evenly and moderately densely covered with minute setae.
