= Moronoserica songbae =

Scientific classification
- Kingdom: Animalia
- Phylum: Arthropoda
- Class: Insecta
- Order: Coleoptera
- Suborder: Polyphaga
- Infraorder: Scarabaeiformia
- Family: Scarabaeidae
- Genus: Moronoserica
- Species: M. songbae

Binomial name
- Moronoserica songbae Ahrens, Lukic & Liu, 2023

Species of beetle

Moronoserica songbae is a species of beetle of the family Scarabaeidae. It is found in Thailand.

== Description ==
Adults reach a length of about 6.1 mm. They have a brown, oval body. The elytra are yellow with numerous dark spots and the frons, pronotum and spots on the elytra have a greenish shine. The dorsal surface is dull and partly iridescent. The pronotum and elytra are partly moderately densely covered with white, robust, scale-like setae.

== Etymology ==
The species name is derived from the type locality, the Song Bae stream.
