= Moronoserica banvaneue =

Scientific classification
- Kingdom: Animalia
- Phylum: Arthropoda
- Class: Insecta
- Order: Coleoptera
- Suborder: Polyphaga
- Infraorder: Scarabaeiformia
- Family: Scarabaeidae
- Genus: Moronoserica
- Species: M. banvaneue

Binomial name
- Moronoserica banvaneue (Bohacz & Ahrens, 2020)

Synonyms
- Microserica banvaneue Bohacz & Ahrens, 2020

Species of beetle

Moronoserica banvaneue is a species of beetle of the family Scarabaeidae. It is found in Laos, Thailand and Vietnam.

== Description ==
Adults reach a length of about 6.5–9.1 mm. They have a dark yellowish brown, oval body. The frons, odd elytral intervals and a large median spot on the pronotum are dark with a greenish shine. The dorsal surface is iridescent and the labroclypeus is shiny. The dorsal surface is almost evenly and moderately densely covered with minute setae and there are white, scale-like, erect setae on the elytra.

== Etymology ==
The species is named after its type locality, Ban Van Eue.
