= Moronoserica ventrosa =

Scientific classification
- Kingdom: Animalia
- Phylum: Arthropoda
- Class: Insecta
- Order: Coleoptera
- Suborder: Polyphaga
- Infraorder: Scarabaeiformia
- Family: Scarabaeidae
- Genus: Moronoserica
- Species: M. ventrosa

Binomial name
- Moronoserica ventrosa (Bohacz & Ahrens, 2020)

Synonyms
- Microserica ventrosa Bohacz & Ahrens, 2020

Species of beetle

Moronoserica ventrosa is a species of beetle of the family Scarabaeidae. It is found in Laos and China (Yunnan).

== Description ==
Adults reach a length of about 6.7–7.5 mm. They have a dark yellowish brown, oval body. The midline, scutellum, and elytral striae are yellowish brown, while the frons, sutural and odd intervals, two spots on each side of the pronotum, and its margins are dark brown with a greenish shine. The dorsal surface is dull (but the labroclypeus is shiny) and almost evenly and moderately densely covered with minute setae, with white, robust, erect setae on the elytra.

== Etymology ==
The species name is derived from Latin ventrosa (meaning large belly) and refers to the ventrally strongly expanded lateral lamina of the phallobase.
