= Moronoserica crenatostriata =

Scientific classification
- Kingdom: Animalia
- Phylum: Arthropoda
- Class: Insecta
- Order: Coleoptera
- Suborder: Polyphaga
- Infraorder: Scarabaeiformia
- Family: Scarabaeidae
- Genus: Moronoserica
- Species: M. crenatostriata

Binomial name
- Moronoserica crenatostriata (Ahrens, 2004)

Synonyms
- Microserica crenatostriata Ahrens, 2004

Species of beetle

Moronoserica crenatostriata is a species of beetle of the family Scarabaeidae. It is found in India (Meghalaya).

== Description ==
Adults reach a length of about 6.6–7.1 mm. They have a reddish dark brown, oval body. The frons has a greenish lustre and the elytra are yellowish with the odd intervals dark. The dorsal surface is moderately shiny (but the labroclypeus is strongly shiny) and almost evenly and moderately densely covered with short to minute white setae, the elytra also with sparse, moderately long and fine, erect setae interspersed.

== Etymology ==
The species name is derived from Latin crenatus (meaning notched) and striatus (meaning striate).
