= Moronoserica =

Scientific classification
- Kingdom: Animalia
- Phylum: Arthropoda
- Class: Insecta
- Order: Coleoptera
- Suborder: Polyphaga
- Infraorder: Scarabaeiformia
- Family: Scarabaeidae
- Subfamily: Sericinae
- Tribe: Sericini
- Genus: Moronoserica; Ahrens, Lukic & Liu, 2023

Genus of leaf beetles

Moronoserica is a genus of beetles belonging to the family Scarabaeidae.

== Species ==
- Moronoserica banmethout Ahrens, Lukic & Liu, 2023
- Moronoserica banvaneue (Bohacz & Ahrens, 2020)
- Moronoserica crenatostriata (Ahrens, 2004)
- Moronoserica geberbauer (Ahrens, 2004)
- Moronoserica ginae (Bohacz & Ahrens, 2020)
- Moronoserica helferi (Bohacz & Ahrens, 2020)
- Moronoserica lineata (Moser, 1915)
- Moronoserica renong Ahrens, Lukic & Liu, 2023
- Moronoserica songbae Ahrens, Lukic & Liu, 2023
- Moronoserica squamulata (Moser, 1915)
- Moronoserica squamulatoides Ahrens, Lukic & Liu, 2023
- Moronoserica tenasserimensis (Bohacz & Ahrens, 2020)
- Moronoserica thungyai Ahrens, Lukic & Liu, 2023
- Moronoserica ventrosa (Bohacz & Ahrens, 2020)
