= Moronoserica tenasserimensis =

Scientific classification
- Kingdom: Animalia
- Phylum: Arthropoda
- Class: Insecta
- Order: Coleoptera
- Suborder: Polyphaga
- Infraorder: Scarabaeiformia
- Family: Scarabaeidae
- Genus: Moronoserica
- Species: M. tenasserimensis

Binomial name
- Moronoserica tenasserimensis (Bohacz & Ahrens, 2020)

Synonyms
- Microserica tenasserimensis Bohacz & Ahrens, 2020

Species of beetle

Moronoserica tenasserimensis is a species of beetle of the family Scarabaeidae. It is found in Myanmar.

== Description ==
Adults reach a length of about 4.8–4.9 mm. They have a dark yellowish brown, oval body. The antennae and even intervals and base of the elytra are yellow, while the frons, odd intervals and several spots and the pronotum are darker brown, partly with a greenish shine. The dorsal surface is dull (but the labroclypeus is shiny) and almost evenly and moderately densely covered with small white scale-like setae.

== Etymology ==
The species name is derived from its occurrence in the Tenasserim region.
