= Moronoserica renong =

Scientific classification
- Kingdom: Animalia
- Phylum: Arthropoda
- Class: Insecta
- Order: Coleoptera
- Suborder: Polyphaga
- Infraorder: Scarabaeiformia
- Family: Scarabaeidae
- Genus: Moronoserica
- Species: M. renong

Binomial name
- Moronoserica renong Ahrens, Lukic & Liu, 2023

Species of beetle

Moronoserica renong is a species of beetle of the family Scarabaeidae. It is found in Thailand.

== Description ==
Adults reach a length of about 5.1–5.2 mm. They have a brown, oval body. The antennae are yellow and the frons, small spots of the elytral intervals and multiple smaller, symmetric spots on each side of the pronotum are darker, with a greenish shine. The dorsal surface is iridescent shiny, partly dull (while the labroclypeus is shiny). The dorsal surface is almost evenly and moderately densely covered with small white setae, while there are single long erect setae on the elytra. The dark spots are glabrous.

== Etymology ==
The species name is derived from the type locality of the species, Renong.
