= Moronoserica squamulata =

Scientific classification
- Kingdom: Animalia
- Phylum: Arthropoda
- Clade: Pancrustacea
- Class: Insecta
- Order: Coleoptera
- Suborder: Polyphaga
- Infraorder: Scarabaeiformia
- Family: Scarabaeidae
- Genus: Moronoserica
- Species: M. squamulata

Binomial name
- Moronoserica squamulata (Moser, 1915)

Synonyms
- Neoserica squamulata Moser, 1915; Microserica squamulata

Species of beetle

Moronoserica squamulata is a species of beetle of the family Scarabaeidae. It is found in Cambodia and Thailand.

== Description ==
Adults reach a length of about 7.4–8.7 mm. They have a reddish dark brown, oval body. The elytra are yellowish. The dorsal surface is dull (except for the shiny labroclypeus) and almost evenly and moderately densely covered with short scalelike setae. The elytra also have sparse, long and fine, erect setae interspersed.
