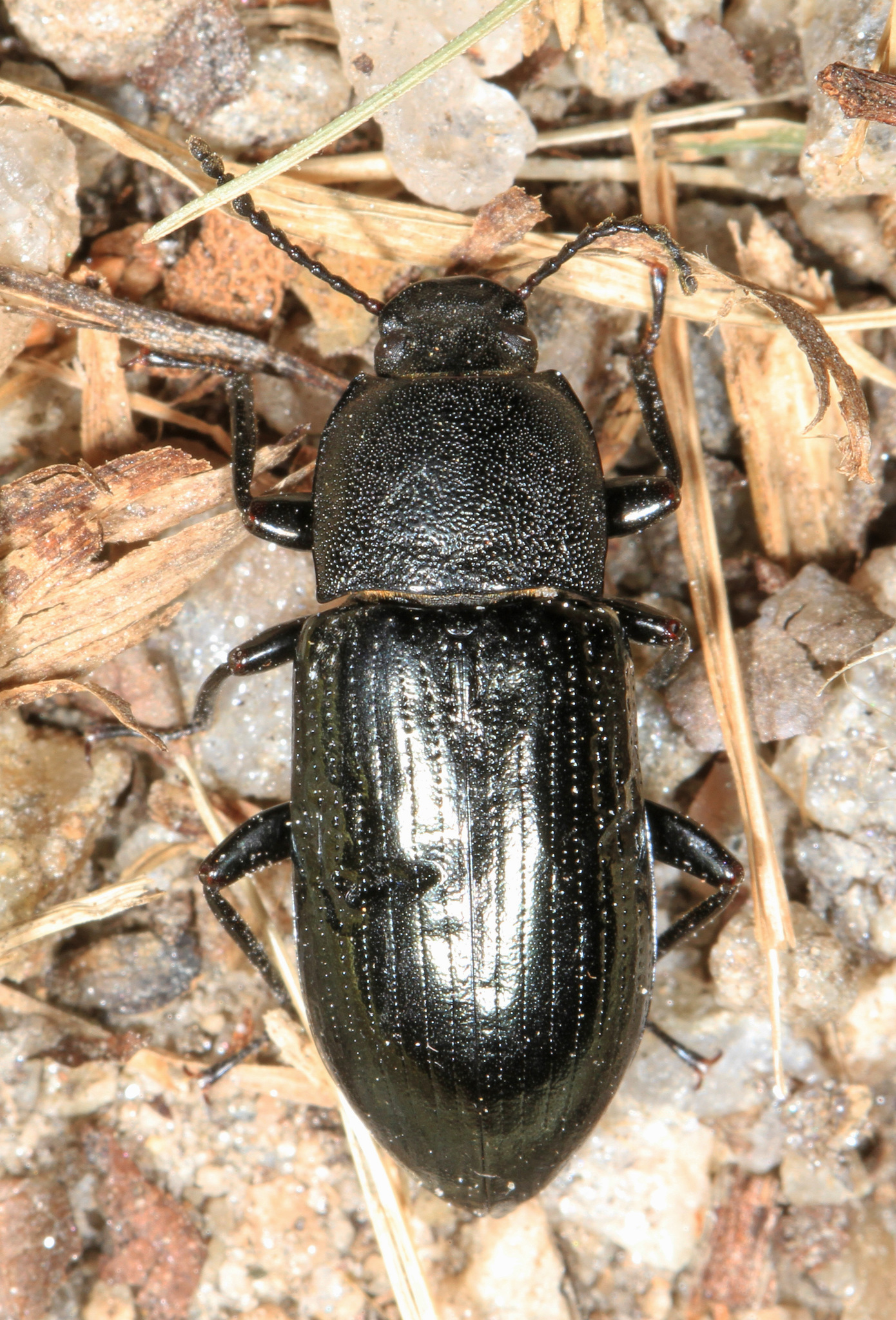
- Centronopus calcaratus, Virginia

Scientific classification
- Kingdom: Animalia
- Phylum: Arthropoda
- Class: Insecta
- Order: Coleoptera
- Suborder: Polyphaga
- Infraorder: Cucujiformia
- Family: Tenebrionidae
- Subfamily: Tenebrioninae
- Tribe: Centronopini
- Genus: Centronopus
- Species: C. calcaratus

Binomial name
- Centronopus calcaratus (Fabricius, 1798)

Synonyms
- Scaurus calcaratus Fabricius, 1798

= Centronopus calcaratus =

Species of beetles

Centronopus calcaratus is a species of darkling beetle in the family Tenebrionidae. It is found in North America.
