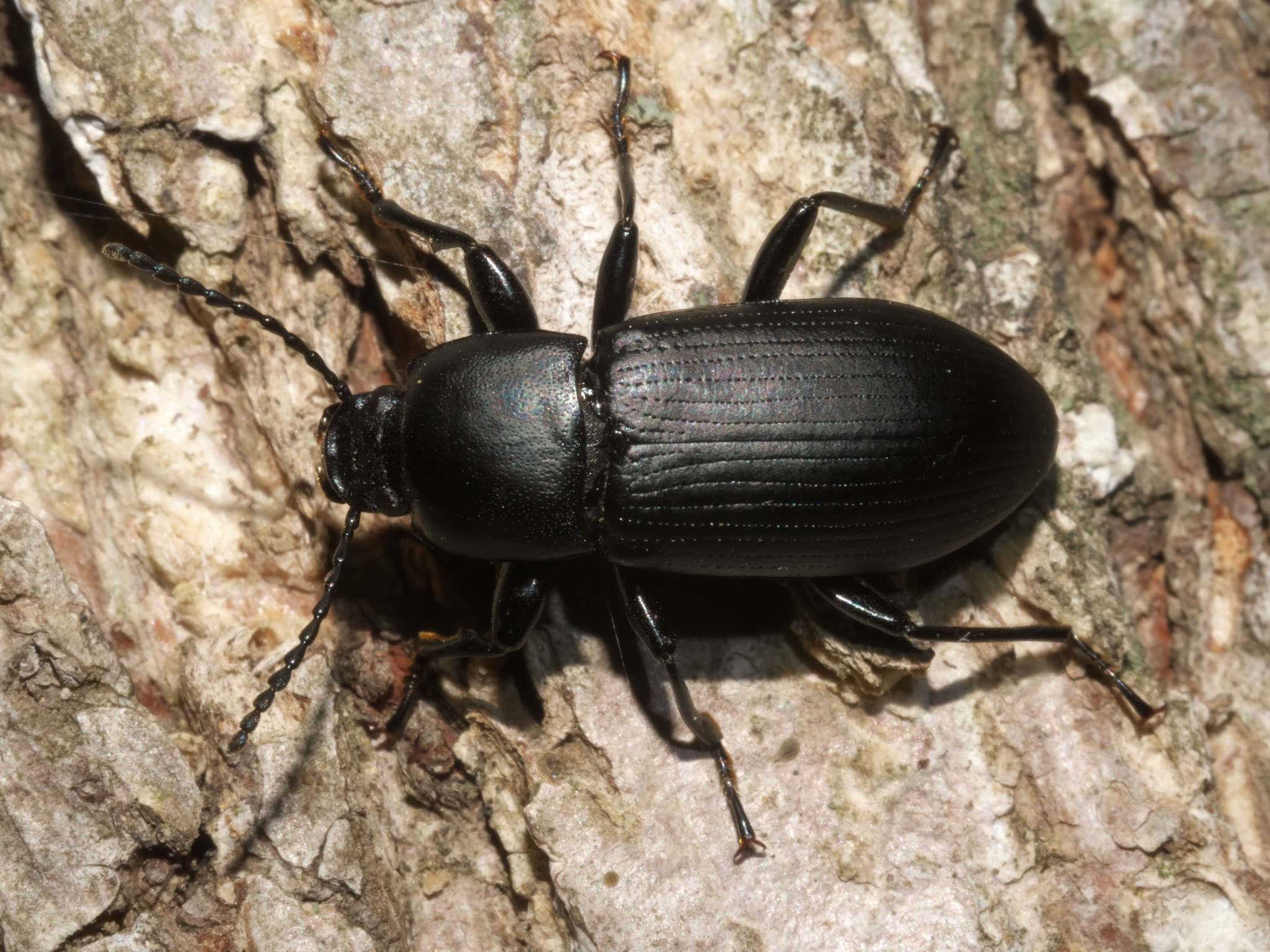
- Centronopus opacus, Oklahoma

Scientific classification
- Kingdom: Animalia
- Phylum: Arthropoda
- Class: Insecta
- Order: Coleoptera
- Suborder: Polyphaga
- Infraorder: Cucujiformia
- Family: Tenebrionidae
- Subfamily: Tenebrioninae
- Tribe: Centronopini
- Genus: Centronopus
- Species: C. opacus

Binomial name
- Centronopus opacus LeConte, 1859

= Centronopus opacus =

Species of beetles

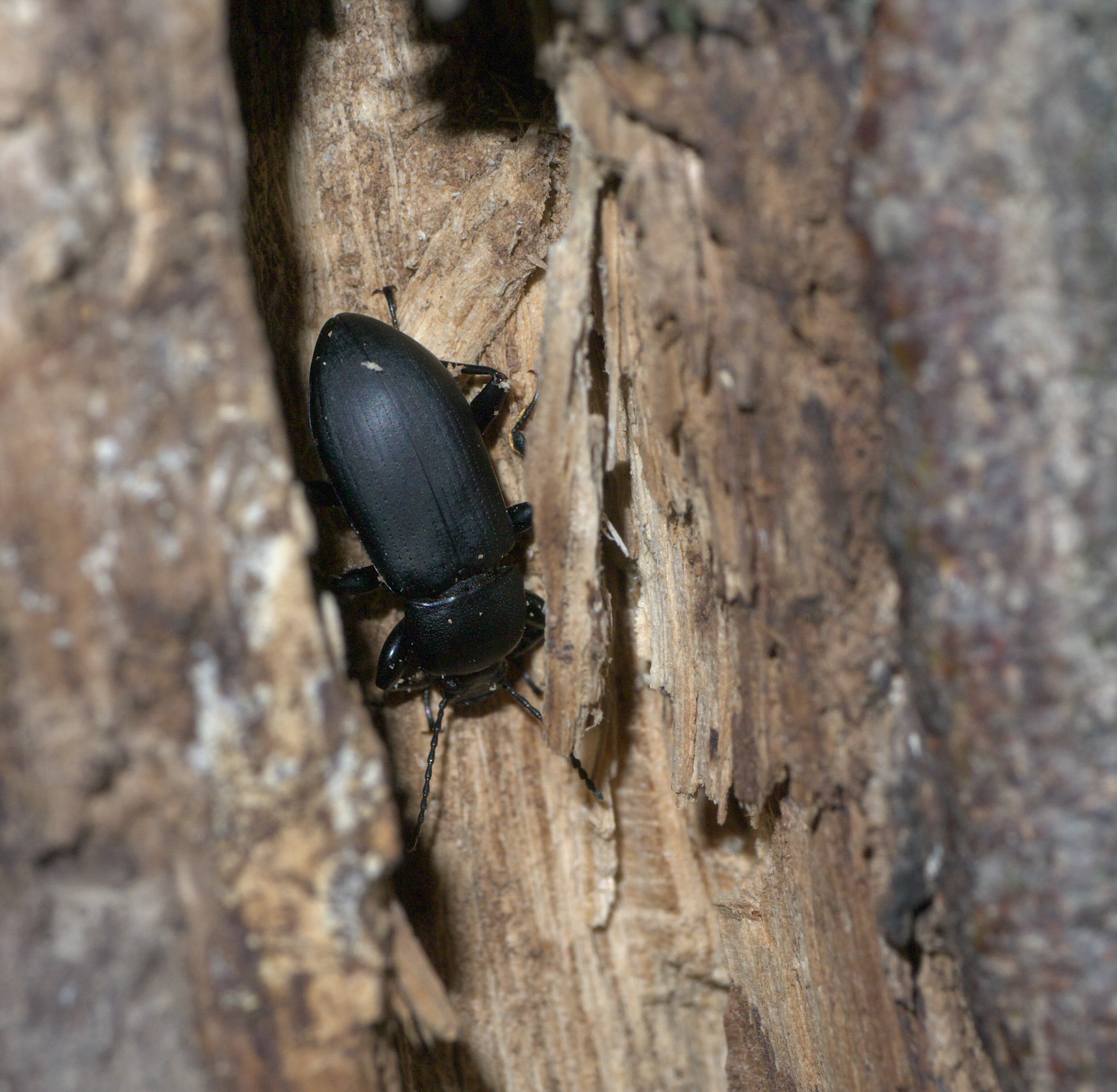
Centronopus opacus, Oklahoma

Centronopus opacus is a species of darkling beetle in the family Tenebrionidae. It is found in North America.
