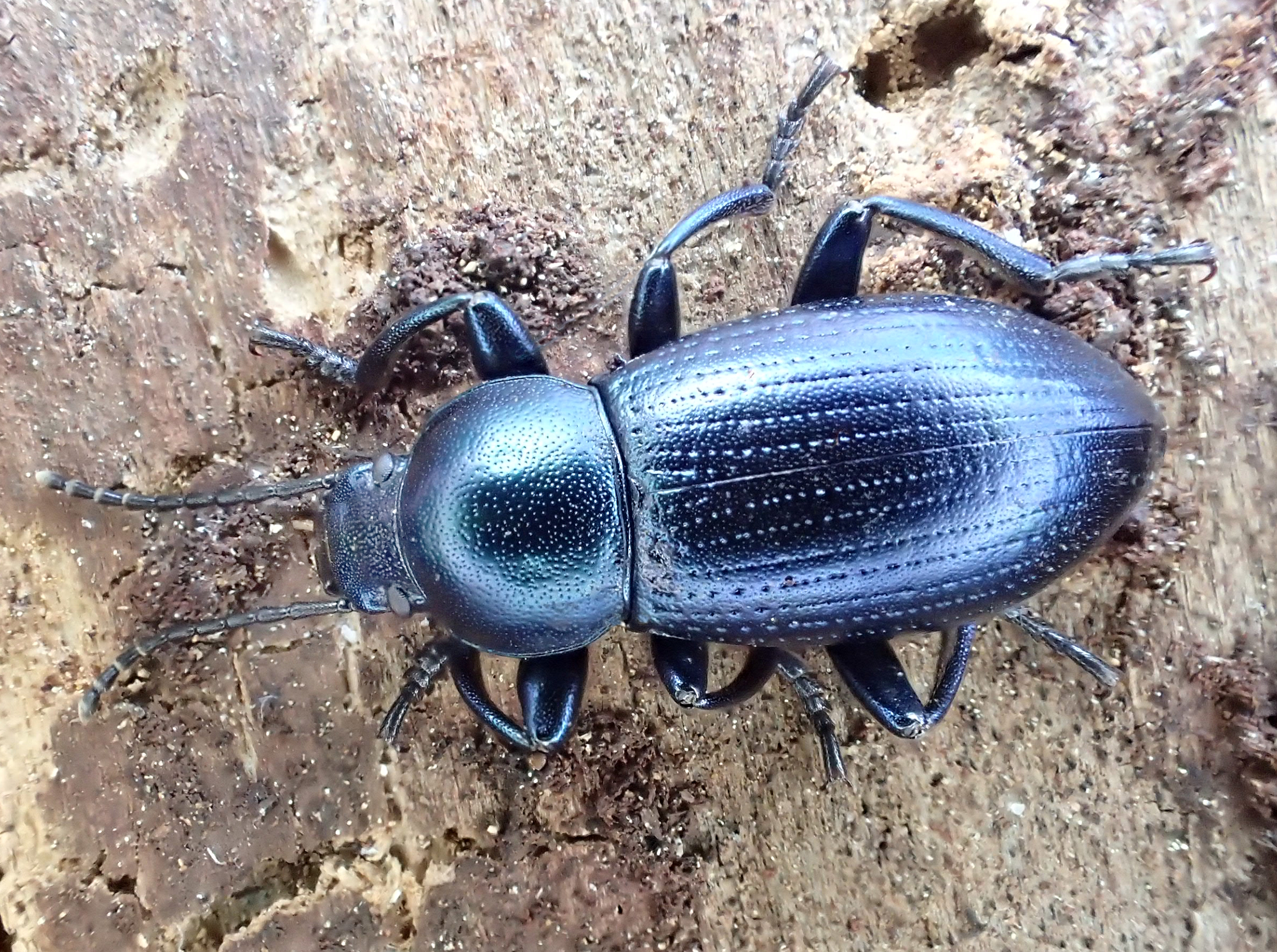

Scientific classification
- Domain: Eukaryota
- Kingdom: Animalia
- Phylum: Arthropoda
- Class: Insecta
- Order: Coleoptera
- Suborder: Polyphaga
- Infraorder: Cucujiformia
- Family: Tenebrionidae
- Genus: Raiboscelis
- Species: R. azureus

Binomial name
- Raiboscelis azureus Brulle, 1832

= Raiboscelis azureus =

Species of beetle

Raiboscelis azureus is a species of darkling beetle in the subfamily Tenebrioninae.

== Description ==
Raiboscelis azureus is 14–15 millimeters long, with a dark blue, rarely black, upper side. Like other species in the genus, R. azureus has densely spotted rows on the elytra. The spaces between the dots in each row are fine but very distinct.

== Range ==
Raiboscelis azureus is found in Greece and Albania

== Taxonomy ==
Raiboscelis azureus contains the following subspecies:

- Raiboscelis azureus azureus
- Raiboscelis azureus obliteratus
