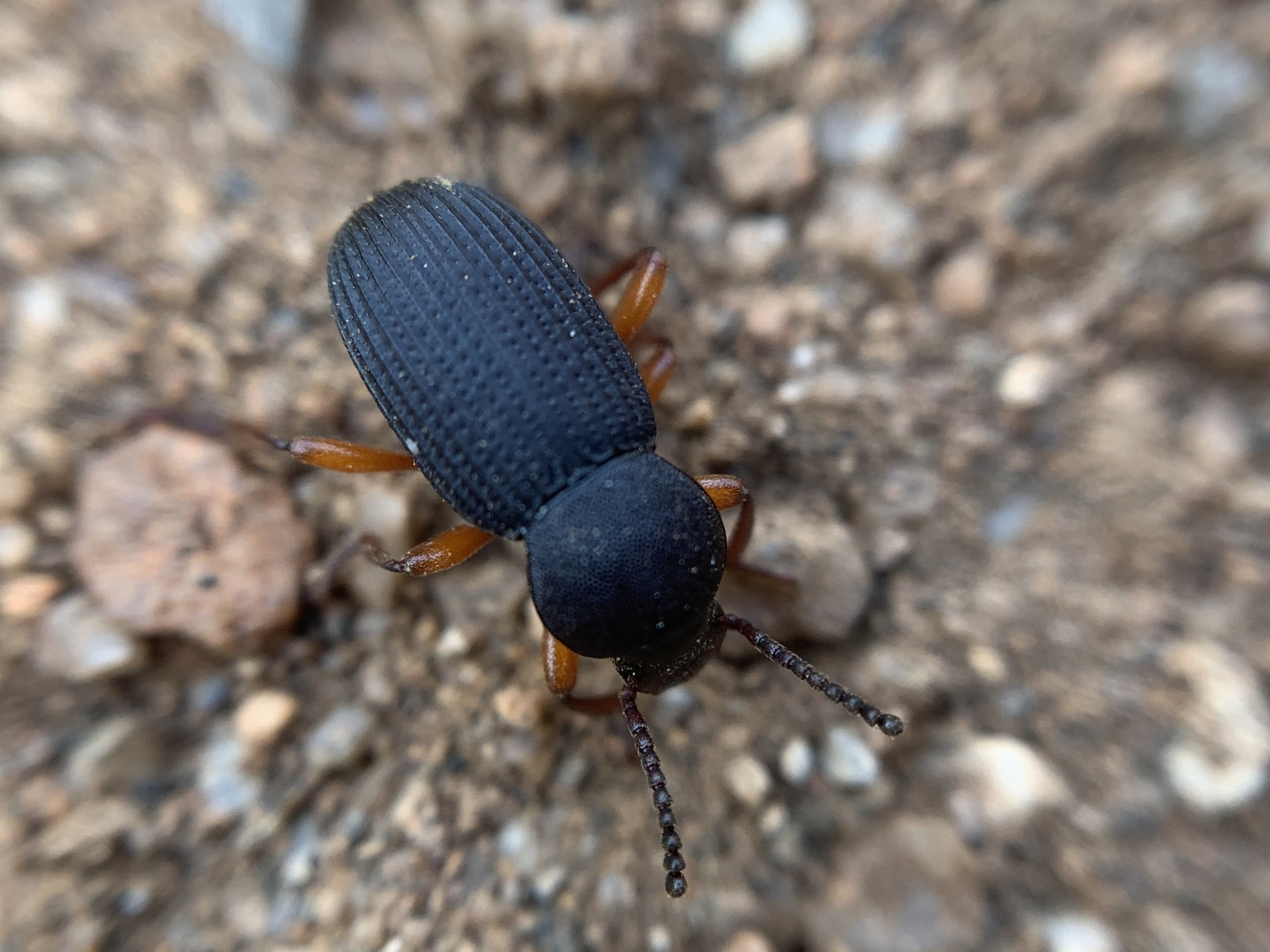
- Apsena, California

Scientific classification
- Domain: Eukaryota
- Kingdom: Animalia
- Phylum: Arthropoda
- Class: Insecta
- Order: Coleoptera
- Suborder: Polyphaga
- Infraorder: Cucujiformia
- Family: Tenebrionidae
- Subfamily: Tenebrioninae
- Tribe: Eulabini; Horn, 1870

= Eulabini =

Tribe of beetles

Eulabini is a tribe of darkling beetles in the family Tenebrionidae. There are at least three genera in Eulabini, found in North America.

== Genera ==
These genera belong to the tribe Eulabini:

- Apsena Leconte, 1862
- Epantius LeConte, 1851
- Eulabis Eschscholtz, 1829
