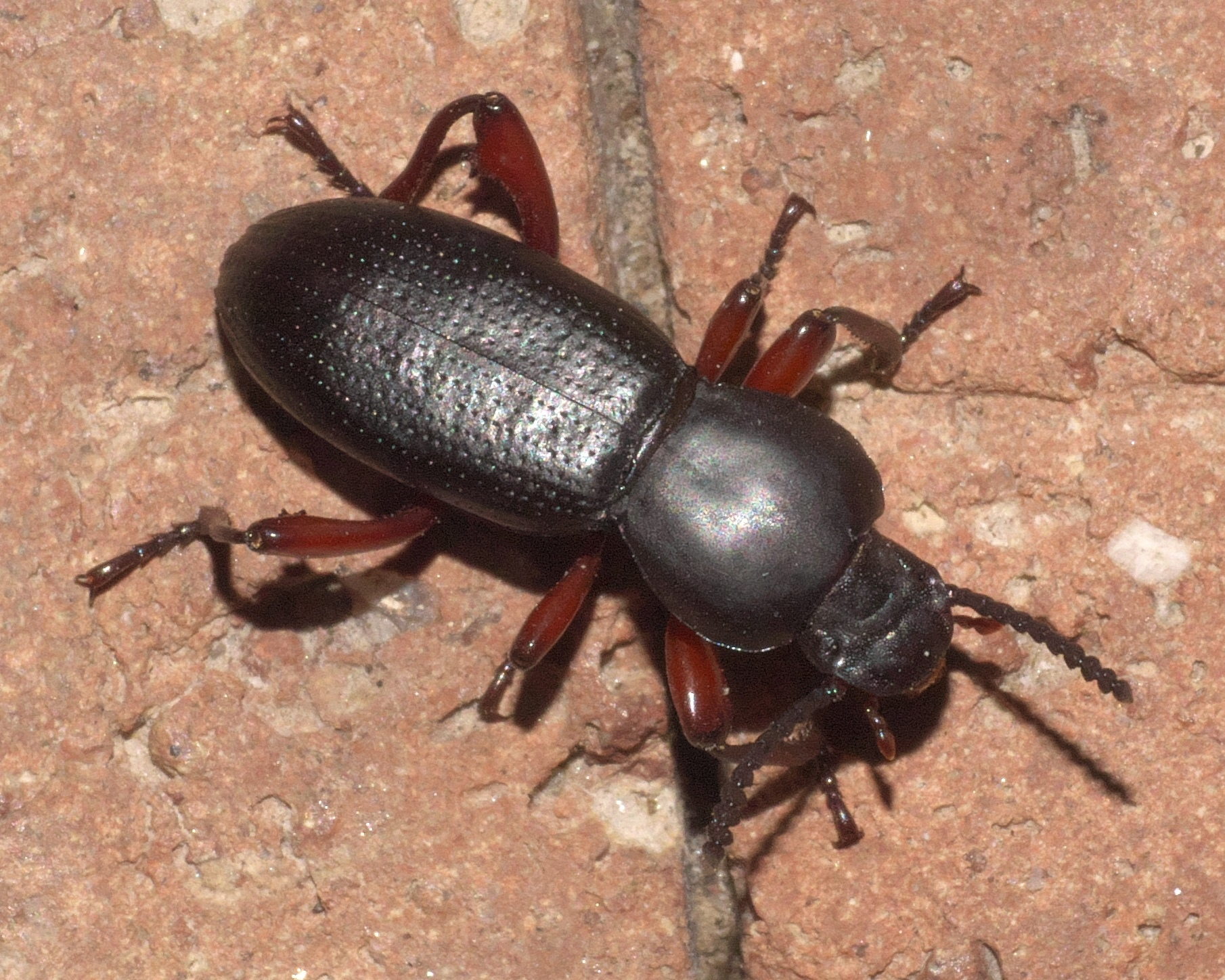
- Argoporis, Arizona

Scientific classification
- Kingdom: Animalia
- Phylum: Arthropoda
- Class: Insecta
- Order: Coleoptera
- Suborder: Polyphaga
- Infraorder: Cucujiformia
- Family: Tenebrionidae
- Subfamily: Tenebrioninae
- Tribe: Cerenopini
- Genus: Argoporis; Horn, 1870

Synonyms
- Threnus Motschoulsky, 1870

= Argoporis =

Genus of beetles

Argoporis is a genus of darkling beetles in the family Tenebrionidae. There are more than 20 described species in Argoporis. They are found in North America.

== Species ==
These 28 species belong to the genus Argoporis:

- Argoporis aequalis Blaisdell, 1923
- Argoporis alutacea Casey, 1890
- Argoporis apicalis Berry, 1980
- Argoporis atripes Horn, 1870
- Argoporis bicolor (LeConte, 1851)
- Argoporis brevicollis Champion, 1885
- Argoporis carinata Berry, 1980
- Argoporis cavifrons Champion, 1885
- Argoporis colimensis Berry, 1980
- Argoporis costipennis (LeConte, 1851)
- Argoporis costulata (Horn, 1870)
- Argoporis craigi Berry, 1980
- Argoporis crassicornis Champion, 1885
- Argoporis cribrata (LeConte, 1861)
- Argoporis deltodonta Berry, 1980
- Argoporis durangoensis Berry, 1980
- Argoporis ebenina Horn, 1894
- Argoporis estebanensis Berry, 1980
- Argoporis impressa Blaisdell, 1925
- Argoporis inconstans Horn, 1894
- Argoporis laevicollis Champion, 1892
- Argoporis longipes Blaisdell, 1923
- Argoporis nigra
- Argoporis obregonensis Berry, 1980
- Argoporis regalis Berry, 1980
- Argoporis rufipes Berry, 1980
- Argoporis tridentata Champion, 1892
- Argoporis unicalcarata Champion, 1892
