= Artystona =

Scientific classification
- Kingdom: Animalia
- Phylum: Arthropoda
- Class: Insecta
- Order: Coleoptera
- Suborder: Polyphaga
- Infraorder: Cucujiformia
- Family: Tenebrionidae
- Subfamily: Tenebrioninae
- Tribe: Titaenini
- Genus: Artystona; Bates, 1873

Genus of beetles

Artystona is a genus of insects in the darkling beetle family Tenebrionidae. Adults hide during the day in dead wood or under loose bark, and emerge at night to feed on epiphytic lichens. They are unique among New Zealand tenebrionids for this behaviour. There are six recognised species, which are endemic to New Zealand.

== Taxonomy ==
Artystona contains the following species:

- Artystona richmondiana Watt, 1992
- Artystona lata Watt, 1992
- Artystona obscura Sharp, 1886
- Artystona erichsoni White, 1846
- Artystona wakefieldi Bates, 1874
- Artystona rugiceps Bates, 1874
