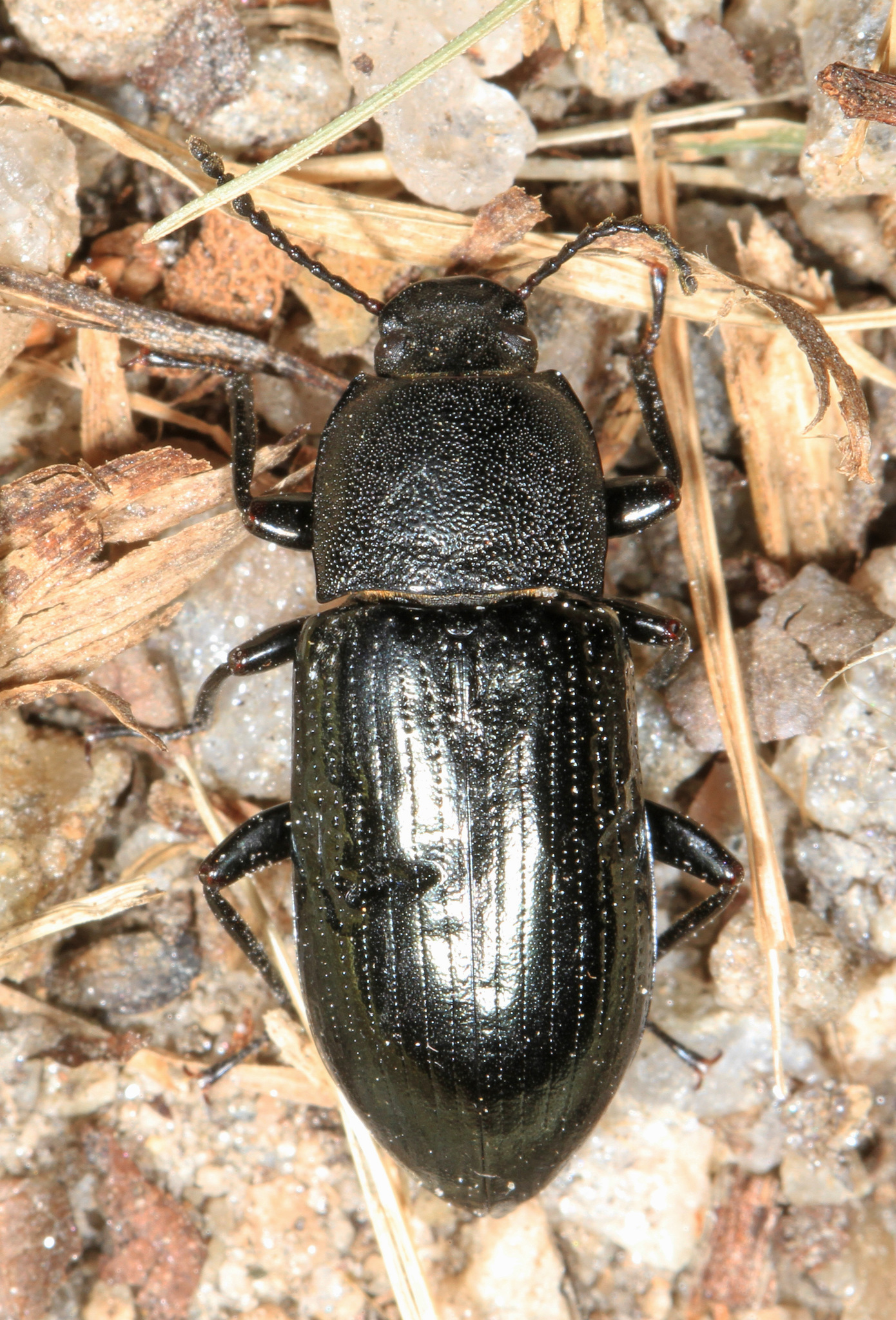
- Centronopus calcaratus, Virginia

Scientific classification
- Kingdom: Animalia
- Phylum: Arthropoda
- Class: Insecta
- Order: Coleoptera
- Suborder: Polyphaga
- Infraorder: Cucujiformia
- Family: Tenebrionidae
- Subfamily: Tenebrioninae
- Tribe: Centronopini
- Genus: Centronopus; Solier, 1848

Subgenera
- Centronopus Solier, 1848; Menechides Motschulsky, 1872

Synonyms
- Centronipus Dejean, 1834; Centropus Jakobson, 1914; Menechides Motschoulsky, 1872; Pyres Champion, 1885; Scotobates Rye, 1877

= Centronopus =

Genus of beetles

Centronopus is a genus of darkling beetles in the family Tenebrionidae. There are about nine described species in Centronopus, found in North America.

== Species ==
These nine species belong to the genus Centronopus:

- Centronopus batesi (Champion, 1885)
- Centronopus beardsleyi Spilman, 1962
- Centronopus bimaculatus Champion, 1892
- Centronopus calcaratus (Fabricius, 1798)
- Centronopus grandicollis Champion, 1885
- Centronopus nigrofasciatus (Gebien, 1928)
- Centronopus opacus LeConte, 1859
- Centronopus speciosus Pascoe, 1883
- Centronopus suppressus (Say, 1835)
