= Trachelostenus =

Scientific classification
- Domain: Eukaryota
- Kingdom: Animalia
- Phylum: Arthropoda
- Class: Insecta
- Order: Coleoptera
- Suborder: Polyphaga
- Infraorder: Cucujiformia
- Family: Tenebrionidae
- Subfamily: Tenebrioninae
- Tribe: Trachelostenini
- Genus: Trachelostenus; Solier, 1851

Species
- See text

Family of beetles

Trachelostenus is a genus of darkling beetles in the family Tenebrionidae. It is native to the Valdivian forests of Chile, and has at least two species, T. inaequalis (Solier) and T. fascicularis (Philipp). It was historically considered the only member of the family Trachelostenidae, but a 2015 study sunk the genus into the tenebrionid (darkling beetle) subfamily Tenebrioninae.
