= Helea =

Scientific classification
- Kingdom: Animalia
- Phylum: Arthropoda
- Class: Insecta
- Order: Coleoptera
- Suborder: Polyphaga
- Infraorder: Cucujiformia
- Family: Tenebrionidae
- Subfamily: Tenebrioninae
- Tribe: Heleini
- Genus: Helea; Latreille, 1804

Genus of beetles

Helea is a genus of darkling beetles (family Tenebrionidae), native to Australia. The scientific name of genus was published by Pierre André Latreille in 1804.

The genus consists of three species:

- Helaeus brownii (Kirby, 1819)
- Helaeus piceus (Kirby, 1819)
- Heleus perforatus (Latreille, 1817)
