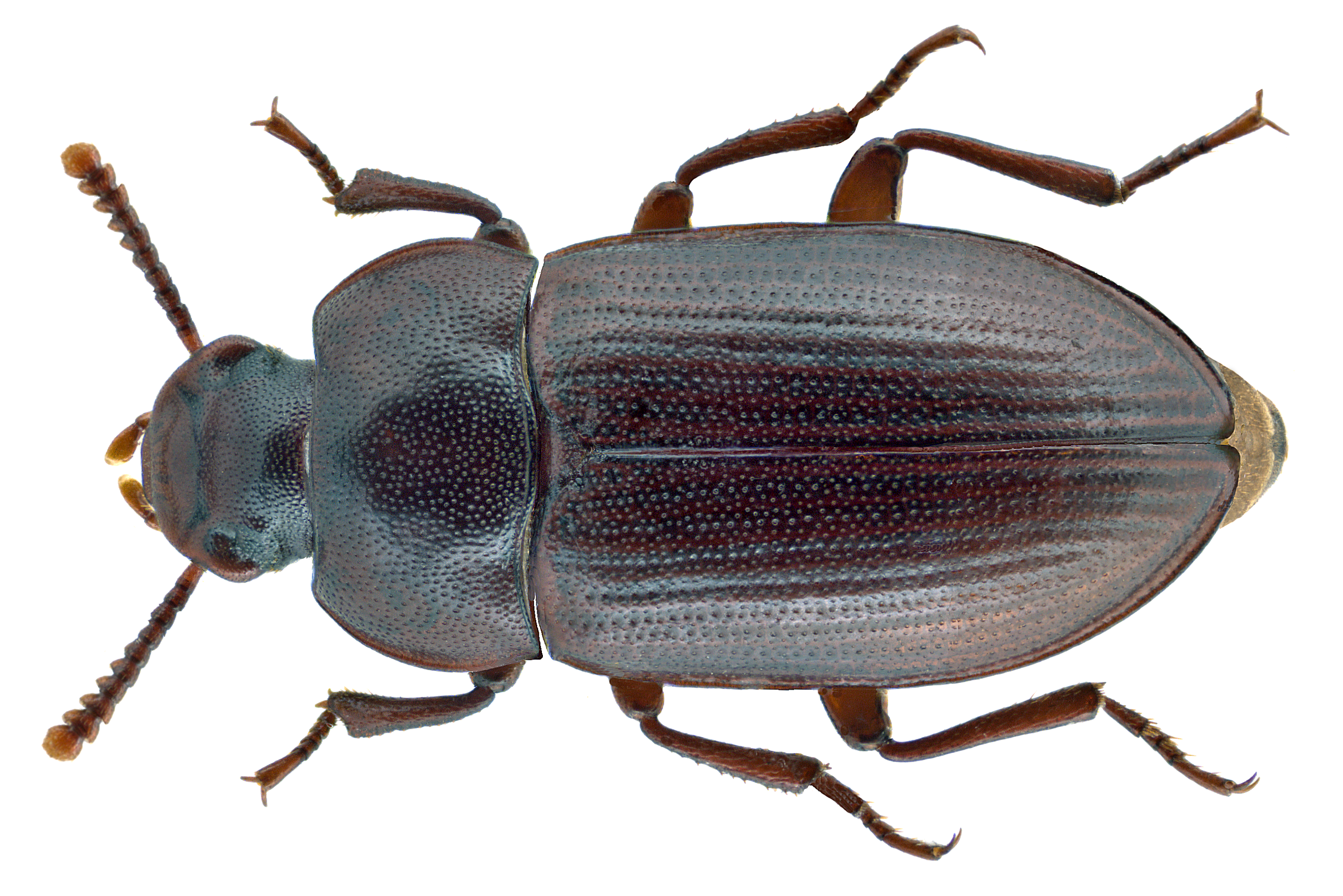
- Alphitobius laevigatus

Scientific classification
- Kingdom: Animalia
- Phylum: Arthropoda
- Class: Insecta
- Order: Coleoptera
- Suborder: Polyphaga
- Infraorder: Cucujiformia
- Family: Tenebrionidae
- Subfamily: Tenebrioninae
- Tribe: Alphitobiini
- Genus: Alphitobius; Stephens, 1829

= Alphitobius =

Genus of beetles

Alphitobius is a genus of darkling beetles in the family Tenebrionidae. There are about 18 described species in Alphitobius.

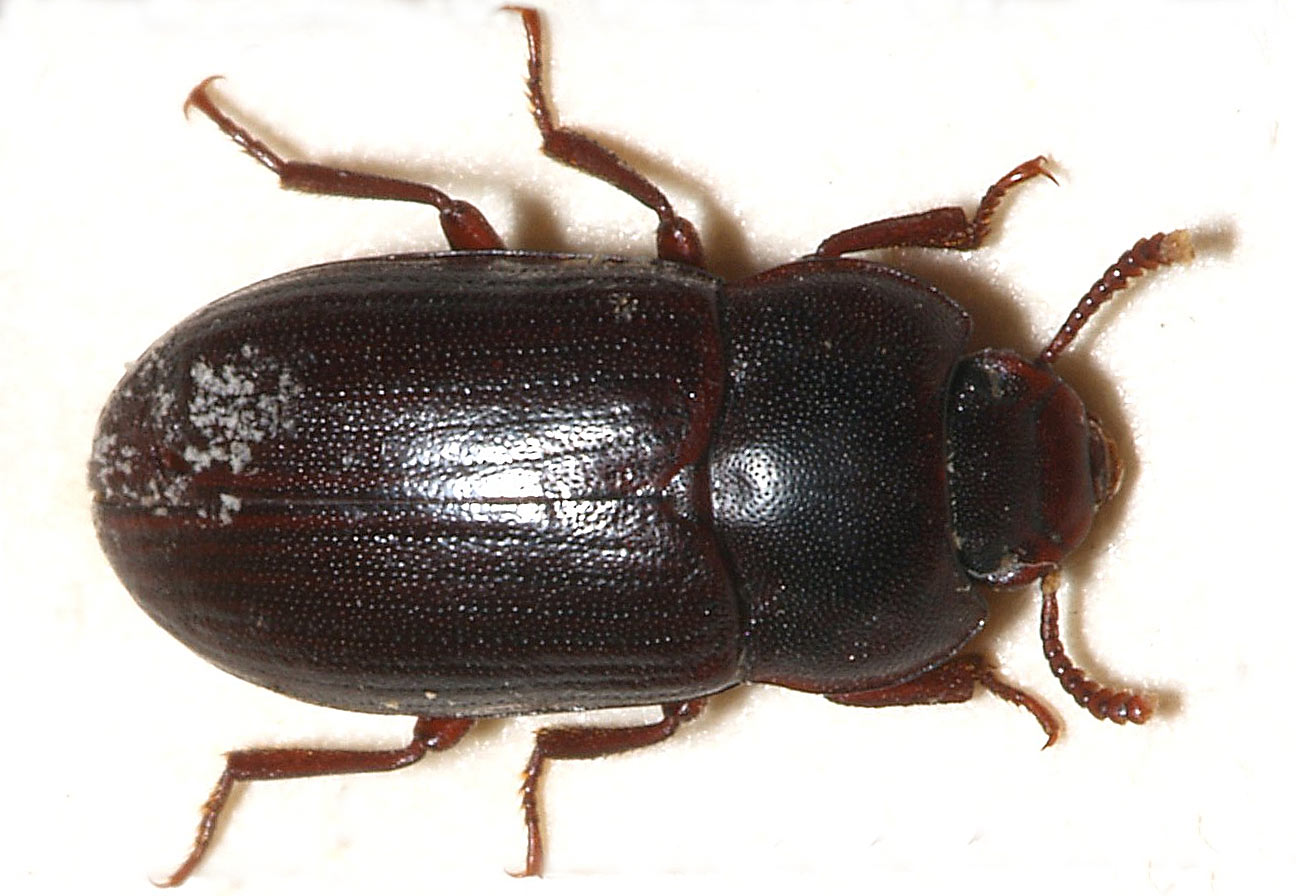
Alphitobius laevigatus

== Species ==
These 18 species belong to the genus Alphitobius:

- Alphitobius acutangulus Gebien, 1921
- Alphitobius arnoldi
- Alphitobius capitaneus Schawaller & Grimm, 2014
- Alphitobius crenatus (Klug, 1833)
- Alphitobius diaperinus (Panzer, 1797) (lesser mealworm)
- Alphitobius grandis Fairmaire, 1897
- Alphitobius hobohmi Koch, 1953
- Alphitobius karrooensis Koch, 1953
- Alphitobius kochi Ardoin, 1958
- Alphitobius laevigatus (Fabricius, 1781) (black fungus beetle)
- Alphitobius lamottei Ardoin, 1963
- Alphitobius leleupi Koch, 1953
- Alphitobius limbalis Fairmaire, 1901
- Alphitobius lucasorum Bremer, 1985
- Alphitobius niger Ferrer, 1983
- Alphitobius parallelipennis Koch, 1953
- Alphitobius rugosulus Koch, 1953
- Alphitobius viator Mulsant & Godart, 1868
