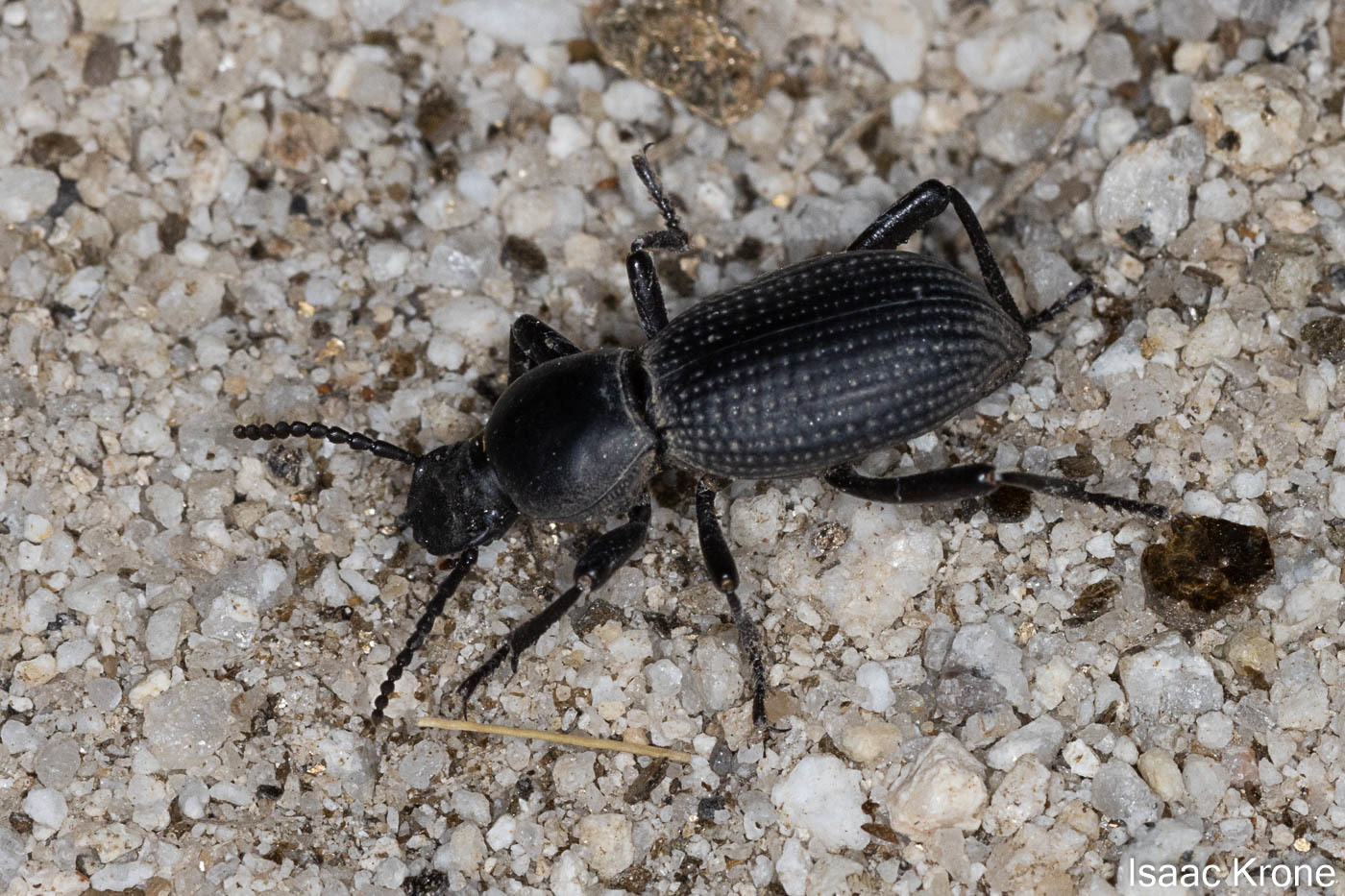
- Cerenopus concolor, California

Scientific classification
- Domain: Eukaryota
- Kingdom: Animalia
- Phylum: Arthropoda
- Class: Insecta
- Order: Coleoptera
- Suborder: Polyphaga
- Infraorder: Cucujiformia
- Family: Tenebrionidae
- Subfamily: Tenebrioninae
- Tribe: Cerenopini; Horn, 1870

= Cerenopini =

Tribe of beetles

Cerenopini is a tribe of darkling beetles in the family Tenebrionidae. There are at least two genera in Cerenopini, found in North America.

== Genera ==
These genera belong to the tribe Cerenopini:

- Argoporis Horn, 1870
- Cerenopus Leconte, 1851
