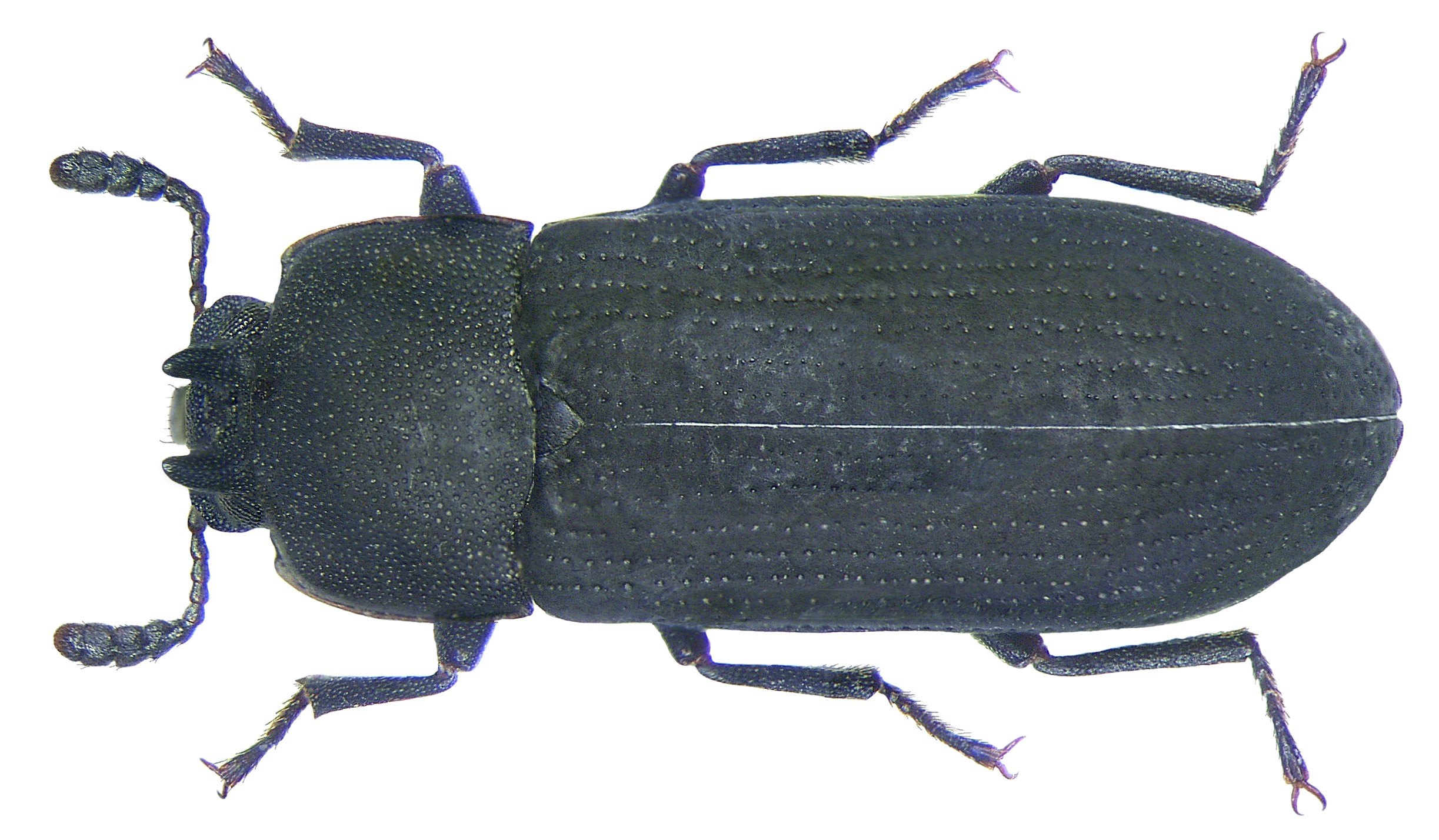
- Cryphaeus gazella, Indonesia

Scientific classification
- Domain: Eukaryota
- Kingdom: Animalia
- Phylum: Arthropoda
- Class: Insecta
- Order: Coleoptera
- Suborder: Polyphaga
- Infraorder: Cucujiformia
- Family: Tenebrionidae
- Subfamily: Tenebrioninae
- Tribe: Toxicini; Oken, 1843

Subtribes
- Dysantina Gebien, 1922; Nycteropina Lacordaire, 1859; Toxicina Oken, 1843

= Toxicini =

Tribe of beetles

Toxicini is a tribe of darkling beetles in the family Tenebrionidae. There are about 17 genera in Toxicini.

== Genera ==
These genera belong to the tribe Toxicini:

- Calymmus Montrouzier, 1860 (Australasia)
- Chalcostylus Fairmaire, 1898 (tropical Africa)
- Cryphaeus Klug, 1833 (the Palearctic, tropical Africa, Indomalaya, and Australasia)
- Cylindrosia Gebien, 1922 (tropical Africa)
- Diceroderes Solier, 1841 (the Neotropics)
- Dysantes Pascoe, 1869 (tropical Africa and Indomalaya)
- Epitoxicum Bates, 1873 (Indomalaya)
- Ilyxerus Pascoe, 1866 (Australasia)
- Macellocerus Solier, 1848 (tropical Africa)
- Mychestes Pascoe, 1870 (Australasia)
- Nycteropus Klug, 1833 (tropical Africa)
- Opostirus Kirsch, 1865 (the Neotropics)
- Orcopagia Pascoe, 1868 (Australasia)
- Ozolais Pascoe, 1866 (the Neotropics)
- Taiwanocryphaeus Masumoto, 1996 (Indomalaya)
- Toxicum Latreille, 1802 (the Palearctic, Indomalaya, and Australasia)
- Wattius Kaszab, 1982 (the Neotropics)
