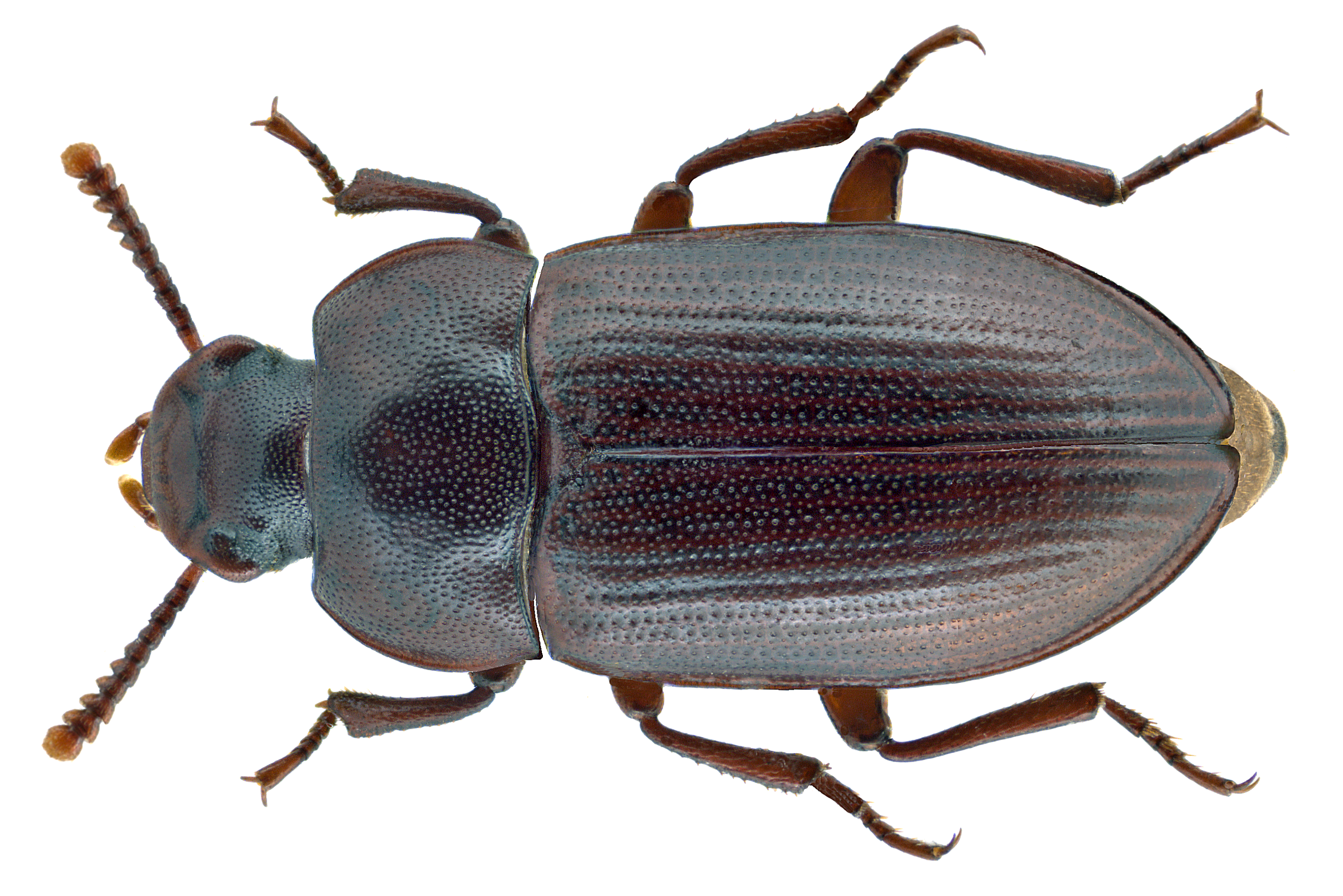
- Alphitobius laevigatus

Scientific classification
- Kingdom: Animalia
- Phylum: Arthropoda
- Class: Insecta
- Order: Coleoptera
- Suborder: Polyphaga
- Infraorder: Cucujiformia
- Family: Tenebrionidae
- Subfamily: Tenebrioninae
- Tribe: Alphitobiini; Reitter, 1917

= Alphitobiini =

Tribe of beetles

Alphitobiini is a tribe of darkling beetles in the family Tenebrionidae. There are about eight genera in Alphitobiini.

== Genera ==
These genera belong to the tribe Alphitobiini:

- Alphitobius Stephens, 1829 (North America, the Palearctic, Indomalaya, and Oceania)
- Ardoinia Kaszab, 1969 (tropical Africa)
- Diaclina Jacquelin du Val, 1861 (the Palearctic, tropical Africa, Indomalaya, and Australasia)
- Epipedodema Gebien, 1921 (tropical Africa)
- Guanobius Grimm, 2008 (Indomalaya)
- Hoplopeltis Fairmaire, 1894 (Indomalaya)
- Peltoides Laporte, 1833 (tropical Africa)
- † Alphitopsis Kirejtshuk, Nabozhenko & Nel, 2011
