= Paoligena =

Scientific classification
- Kingdom: Animalia
- Phylum: Arthropoda
- Class: Insecta
- Order: Coleoptera
- Suborder: Polyphaga
- Infraorder: Cucujiformia
- Family: Tenebrionidae
- Subfamily: Tenebrioninae
- Tribe: Paoligenini
- Genus: Paoligena; Pic, 1928

Genus of beetles

Paoligena is a genus of darkling beetles in the family Tenebrionidae, found in tropical Africa. It is the sole genus of the tribe Paoligenini.
