= Falsocossyphini =

Scientific classification
- Domain: Eukaryota
- Kingdom: Animalia
- Phylum: Arthropoda
- Class: Insecta
- Order: Coleoptera
- Suborder: Polyphaga
- Infraorder: Cucujiformia
- Family: Tenebrionidae
- Subfamily: Tenebrioninae
- Tribe: Falsocossyphini; Ferrer, 2006

Tribe of beetles

Falsocossyphini is a tribe of darkling beetles in the family Tenebrionidae. There are at least three genera in Falsocossyphini.

== Genera ==
These genera belong to the tribe Falsocossyphini:

- Blatticephalus Heller, 1918 (tropical Africa)
- Falsocossyphus Pic, 1916 (Indomalaya)
- Microblattellus Ferrer, 2006 (Indomalaya)
