= Acropteryx =

Scientific classification
- Kingdom: Animalia
- Phylum: Arthropoda
- Clade: Pancrustacea
- Class: Insecta
- Order: Coleoptera
- Suborder: Polyphaga
- Infraorder: Cucujiformia
- Family: Tenebrionidae
- Subfamily: Tenebrioninae
- Tribe: Acropteronini; Doyen, 1989
- Genus: Acropteryx; Gistel, 1831

Type species
- Acropteryx rufipes Gistel, 1831

Synonyms
- List: Acropteron Perty, 1832; Acropteroxys Gistel, 1831 [lapsus]; Acropterum Agassiz, 1846; Arthroplatus Solier, 1851; Sphenosoma Dejean, 1834

Genus of beetles

Acropteryx is an aberrant genus of darkling beetles (family Tenebrionidae). They are found in the Neotropics and due to their distinctness are usually considered a monotypic tribe Acropteronini within the subfamily of typical darkling beetles, Tenebrioninae.

These elongated and slim beetles are suggestive of lizard beetles in appearance. Some earlier authors placed them with these, at that time considered a distinct family Languriidae; nowadays the lizard beetles are recognized as highly apomorphic pleasing fungus beetles and placed in family Erotylidae.

== Species ==
This genus has been monotypic for most of its existence, but more recently some additional species were moved here:

- Acropteryx chabrieri (Fleutiaux & Sallé, 1890)
- Acropteryx crenaticolle (Mäklin, 1862)
- Acropteryx fastigiatum (Mäklin, 1862)
- Acropteryx humile (Mäklin, 1862)
- Acropteryx rufipes Gistel, 1831
