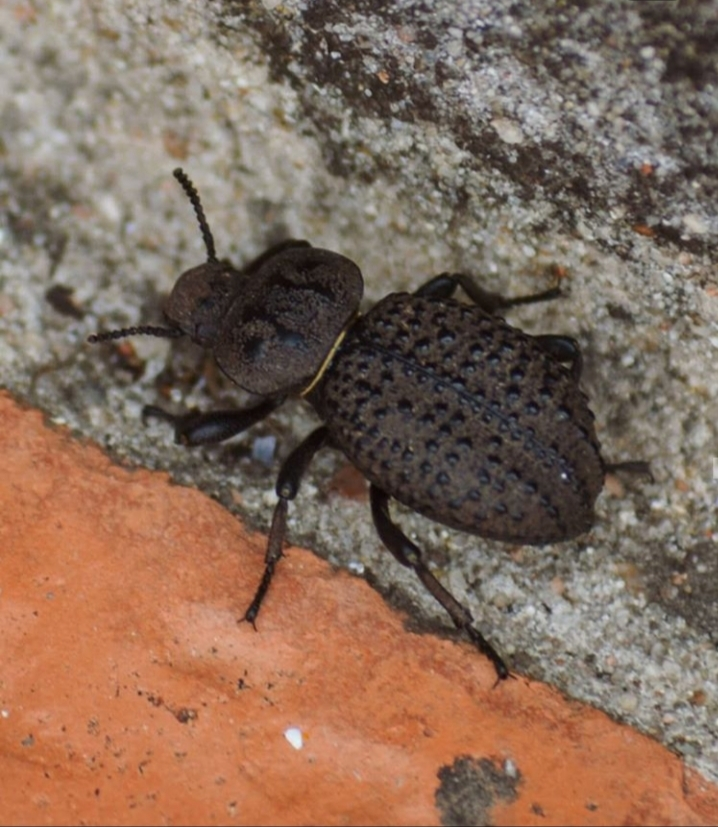
- Scotobius pilularius, Uruguay

Scientific classification
- Domain: Eukaryota
- Kingdom: Animalia
- Phylum: Arthropoda
- Class: Insecta
- Order: Coleoptera
- Suborder: Polyphaga
- Infraorder: Cucujiformia
- Family: Tenebrionidae
- Subfamily: Tenebrioninae
- Tribe: Scotobiini; Solier, 1838

= Scotobiini =

Tribe of beetles

Scotobiini is a tribe of darkling beetles in the family Tenebrionidae. There are about six genera in Scotobiini, found in the Neotropics.

== Genera ==
These genera belong to the tribe Scotobiini:

- Ammophorus Guérin-Méneville, 1831
- Diastoleus Solier, 1838
- Emmallodera Blanchard, 1842
- Leptynoderes Solier, 1838
- Pumiliofossorum Silvestro & Giraldo-Mendoza, 2015
- Scotobius Germar, 1823
