= Epantius =

Scientific classification
- Domain: Eukaryota
- Kingdom: Animalia
- Phylum: Arthropoda
- Class: Insecta
- Order: Coleoptera
- Suborder: Polyphaga
- Infraorder: Cucujiformia
- Family: Tenebrionidae
- Subfamily: Tenebrioninae
- Genus: Epantius; Le Conte, 1851
- Species: E. obscurus

Binomial name
- Epantius obscurus LeConte, 1851

Genus of insects

Epantius is a genus of darkling beetles in the family Tenebrionidae. There is one described species in Epantius, E. obscurus.
