= Dissonomini =

Scientific classification
- Kingdom: Animalia
- Phylum: Arthropoda
- Class: Insecta
- Order: Coleoptera
- Suborder: Polyphaga
- Infraorder: Cucujiformia
- Family: Tenebrionidae
- Subfamily: Tenebrioninae
- Tribe: Dissonomini; G.S. Medvedev, 1968

Tribe of beetles

Dissonomini is a tribe of darkling beetles in the family Tenebrionidae. In 2024, based on molecular evidence, the tribe was transferred to the subfamily Blaptinae. There are at least two genera in Dissonomini, found in the Palearctic.

== Genera ==
These genera belong to the tribe Dissonomini:

- Bradyus Dejean, 1834
- Dissonomus Jacquelin du Val, 1861
