= Rhysopaussini =

Scientific classification
- Domain: Eukaryota
- Kingdom: Animalia
- Phylum: Arthropoda
- Class: Insecta
- Order: Coleoptera
- Suborder: Polyphaga
- Infraorder: Cucujiformia
- Family: Tenebrionidae
- Subfamily: Tenebrioninae
- Tribe: Rhysopaussini; Wasmann, 1896

Tribe of beetles

Rhysopaussini is a tribe of darkling beetles in the family Tenebrionidae. There are at least four genera in Rhysopaussini.

== Genera ==
These genera belong to the tribe Rhysopaussini:

- Mimoxenotermes Pic, 1931 (Indomalaya)
- Rhysopaussus Wasmann, 1896 (Indomalaya)
- Rhyzodina Chevrolat, 1873 (tropical Africa)
- Xenotermes Wasmann, 1896 (Indomalaya)
