= Trachelostenini =

Scientific classification
- Domain: Eukaryota
- Kingdom: Animalia
- Phylum: Arthropoda
- Class: Insecta
- Order: Coleoptera
- Suborder: Polyphaga
- Infraorder: Cucujiformia
- Family: Tenebrionidae
- Subfamily: Tenebrioninae
- Tribe: Trachelostenini; Lacordaire, 1859

Synonyms
- Trachelostenidae

Tribe of beetles

Trachelostenini is a tribe of darkling beetles in the family Tenebrionidae. There are at least three genera in Trachelostenini. It was historically ranked as the family Trachelostenidae, but a 2015 study sunk the family into the tenebrionid (darkling beetle) subfamily Tenebrioninae.

== Genera ==
These genera belong to the tribe Trachelostenini:

- Leaus Matthews & Lawrence, 1992 (Australasia)
- Myrmecodema Gebien, 1943 (the Neotropics)
- Trachelostenus Solier, 1851 (the Neotropics)
