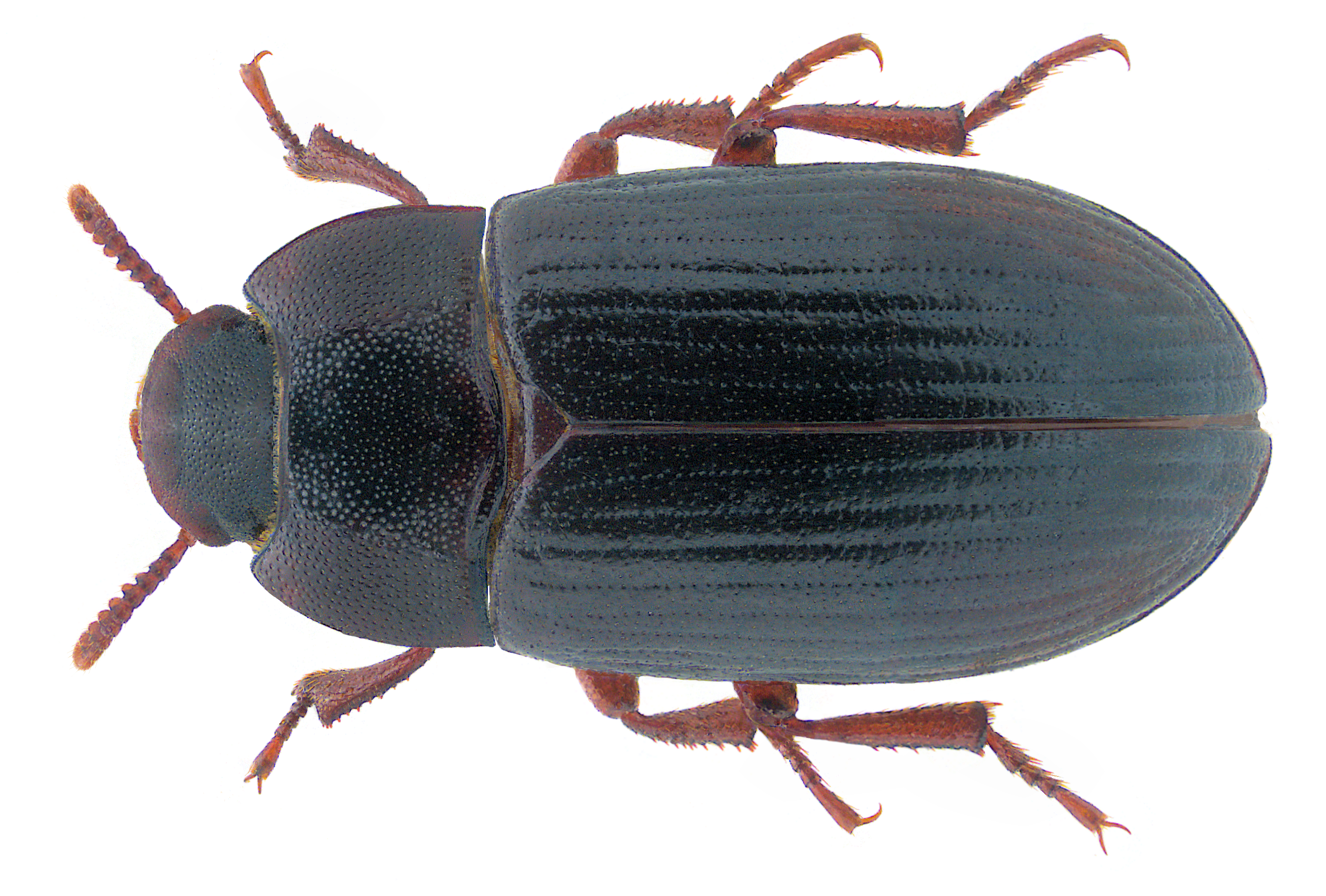

Scientific classification
- Kingdom: Animalia
- Phylum: Arthropoda
- Clade: Pancrustacea
- Class: Insecta
- Order: Coleoptera
- Suborder: Polyphaga
- Infraorder: Cucujiformia
- Family: Tenebrionidae
- Genus: Alphitobius
- Species: A. diaperinus

Binomial name
- Alphitobius diaperinus Panzer, 1797

= Alphitobius diaperinus =

Species of beetle

Alphitobius diaperinus is a species of beetle in the family Tenebrionidae, the darkling beetles. It is known commonly as the lesser mealworm and the litter beetle. It has a cosmopolitan distribution, occurring nearly worldwide. It is known widely as a pest insect of stored food grain products such as flour, and of poultry-rearing facilities and it is a vector of many kinds of animal pathogens. In larval form, it is an approved novel food in the European Union, and also used as animal feed.

== Description ==
The adult lesser mealworm beetle is roughly 6 mm long and widely oval in shape. It is shiny black or brown with reddish brown elytra, the color variable among individuals and changing with age. Much of the body surface is dotted with puncture-like impressions. The antennae are paler at the tips and are covered in tiny, yellowish hairs. The elytra have shallow longitudinal grooves.

The eggs are narrow, whitish or tan, and about 1.5 mm long. The larvae somewhat resemble other mealworms, such as the common mealworm (Tenebrio molitor), but are smaller, measuring up to 11 mm long at the final subadult stage. They are tapering and segmented, with three pairs of legs toward the front end, and whitish when newly emerged from the egg and darken to a yellow-brown. They become pale when preparing to molt between instar stages six to 11 instars occur.

== Distribution ==
This species has long been known throughout the world as a common pest, so its origins are uncertain, but it may have originated in Sub-Saharan Africa. It moved into Europe long ago, and was likely introduced to North America from there.

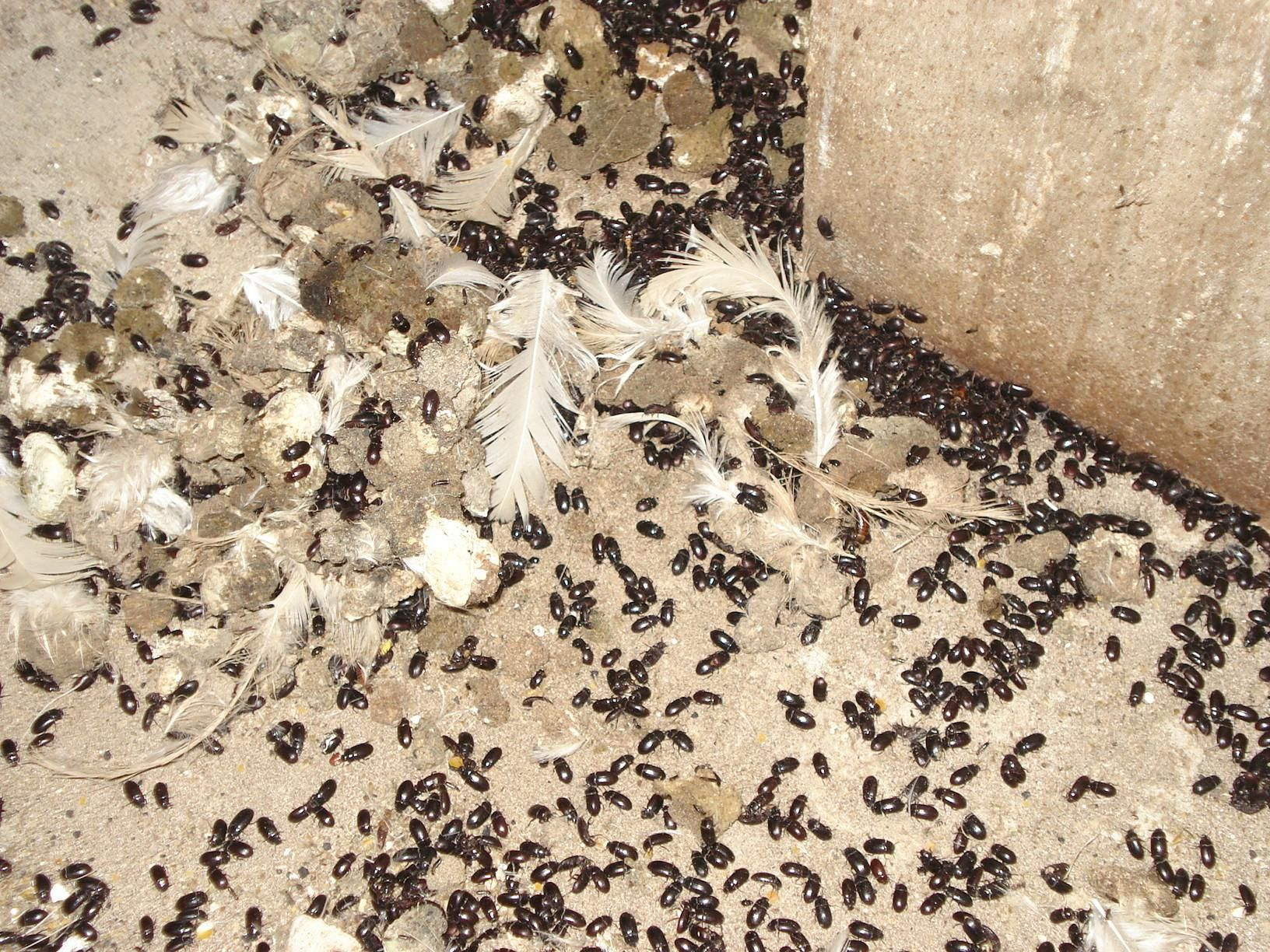
Alphitobius diaperinus in a poultry facility

== Biology ==
A tropical species, the lesser mealworm thrives in warm, humid environments, both natural and established by humans. It inhabits caves, rodent nests, and the nests of birds, including kites, pigeons, hamerkop, house sparrow, and purple martin. It easily colonizes agricultural establishments with abundant food sources and warm conditions, such as grain processing and storage facilities and poultry housing.

The beetle consumes a wide variety of materials, including litter, bird droppings and bat guano, mold, feathers, eggs, and carrion. It feeds on the eggs and larvae of other insects, such as the rice moth (Corcyra cephalonica). It also engages in cannibalism. It commonly feeds on sick or weakened live animals. When it lives in bird housing it may infest and consume dying birds, especially chicks. It was also once observed inhabiting the scrotum of a rat.

The adult female beetle lays usually about 200 to 400 eggs, but it has been known to produce up to 2000. It lays eggs every few days throughout its life, which is generally up to one year long, or up to two years when it is reared in captivity. It deposits the eggs in litter, droppings, grain stores, or cracks in structures. The larvae emerge within a week and take 40 to 100 days to reach maturity, depending on conditions and the food supply. The larvae grow well in high humidity. They pupate alone in secure spots. They are quite active and mobile and burrow quickly when threatened. Larvae and adults are mainly nocturnal, becoming most active at dusk.

== As a pest ==
=== Impacts ===
As a pest, the beetle is most damaging to the poultry industry. This is the most common beetle found in poultry litter. The larvae damage poultry housing structures when they search for suitable pupation spots, chewing through wood, fiberglass, and polystyrene insulation. This destruction can be costly to growers, especially in heating energy costs. The beetles consume the birds' feed and irritate the birds by biting them.

Other insect residents of poultry housing include the housefly (Musca domestica) and its predator, Carcinops pumilio, a clown beetle. The fly is a pest which can sometimes be kept under control by the beetle. The lesser mealworm interferes with this ecology by reducing the survival of clown beetle eggs and larvae.

The lesser mealworm beetle is a vector of many pathogens. It spreads more than 30 bird diseases. It transmits animal viruses such as rotavirus, the turkey coronavirus, the chicken viruses that cause Marek's disease and infectious bursal disease, and the viruses that cause Newcastle disease, avian influenza, and fowlpox. It transmits bacteria such as Campylobacter jejuni, Salmonella enterica serovar Typhimurium, Escherichia coli, and Staphylococcus species. A single exposure of a chick to a contaminated beetle can result in bacterial colonization of the bird's gut. Chicks are more likely to be infected by eating larvae than adult beetles. The beetle can also transmit Aspergillus fungi. It is a vector for Eimeria, protozoa that cause coccidiosis in birds. It carries fowl tapeworms such as Choanotaenia infundibulum and the nematodes Subulura brumpti and Hadjelia truncata.

Poultry have difficulty digesting the beetle and larva, and if they eat them, they can experience intestinal obstruction and gut lesions. Broiler chickens and turkey poults have slower weight gain when they feed on the beetle.

Like other darkling beetles, this species produces defensive benzoquinone compounds that can be irritating to humans, causing asthma, headaches, rhinitis, conjunctivitis, corneal ulcers, and dermatitis with erythema and papules. The benzoquinones may be carcinogenic.

Before the beetle became problematic in poultry, it was better known as a pest of stored goods, including wheat, barley, rice, oatmeal, soybeans, cowpeas, peanuts, linseed, cottonseed, tobacco, and dried meat.

This beetle can become a household pest if it ends up near human habitation in old litter to be used as compost. It emerges when it is attracted to light from homes.

=== Management ===
No agents of biological pest control are used against the lesser mealworm. The fungus Beauveria bassiana is an arthropod pathogen that may prove useful. Some protozoa and spider species are known natural predators.

Control is usually attempted with carbaryl insecticide in the form of powder, liquid, and bait. Thiamethoxam and 9-Tricosene used in conjunction have been shown to be successful in poultry houses. Pyrethroids and boric acid are used. True outbreaks are often uncontrollable and some populations of the beetle have shown resistance to various compounds. Resistance is more common on farms that have been chemically treated for many years. Insecticides are not ideal because they contaminate the poultry and they are not effective on the pest when it burrows out of reach.

Proper maintenance of poultry housing usually keeps the beetle under control, as it propagates in accumulated litter and droppings.

== Use ==
=== As feed ===
The larvae of the litter beetle, like certain other larvae of darkling beetles such as mealworms, are used as animal feed, e.g., fed to captive reptiles. They have been reported as a good first food for Central American wood turtle (Rhinoclemmys pulcherrima mannii) hatchlings, because they are more active than common mealworms and their movement stimulates feeding behavior.

=== As food ===
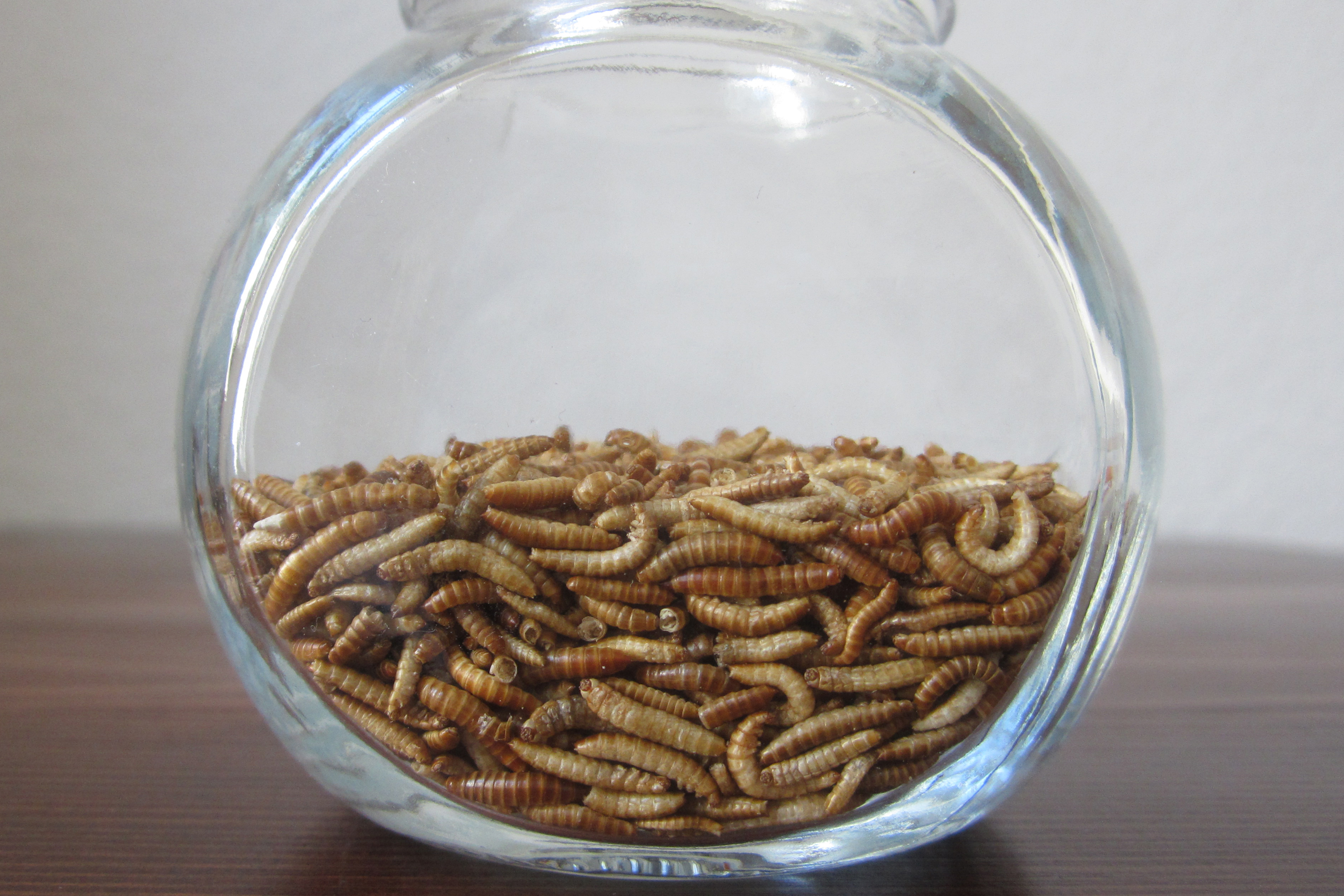
Freeze-dried larvae of Alphitobius diaperinus (marketed as buffalo worms) as food, or food ingredient

The larvae are edible insects and also farmed for human consumption by specialized European insect farms, mostly in the Netherlands and Belgium. The larvae are either sold freeze-dried for consumption, or processed into food such as burger patties, pasta, or snack bars. As food, the larvae are commonly marketed under the term buffalo worms, a name that is also used for the larvae of Alphitobius laevigatus which can lead to confusion. The species can be detected using the PCR method.

On 4 July 2022, EFSA published an opinion confirming the safety of frozen and freeze-dried larvae of Alphitobius diaperinus for human consumption. Approval as novel food in the European Union followed on 6 January 2023 with the EU commission's publication of Implementing Regulation 2023/58 authorising the placing on the market of the frozen, paste, dried and powder forms of Alphitobius diaperinus larvae.

=== In preparation ===
Along with Dermestes beetles, species of this genus are used in museums to clean tissues off carcasses during the preparation of zoological specimens.
