= Apocryphini =

Scientific classification
- Kingdom: Animalia
- Phylum: Arthropoda
- Class: Insecta
- Order: Coleoptera
- Suborder: Polyphaga
- Infraorder: Cucujiformia
- Family: Tenebrionidae
- Subfamily: Tenebrioninae
- Tribe: Apocryphini; Lacordaire, 1859

Tribe of beetles

Apocryphini is a tribe of darkling beetles in the family Tenebrionidae. There are at least four genera in Apocryphini.

== Genera ==
These genera belong to the tribe Apocryphini:

- Apocrypha Eschscholtz, 1831 (North America and the Neotropics)
- Diplocyrtus Quedenfeldt, 1887 (the Palearctic)
- Plastica C.O. Waterhouse, 1903 (the Neotropics)
- Pseudapocrypha Champion, 1886 (the Neotropics)
