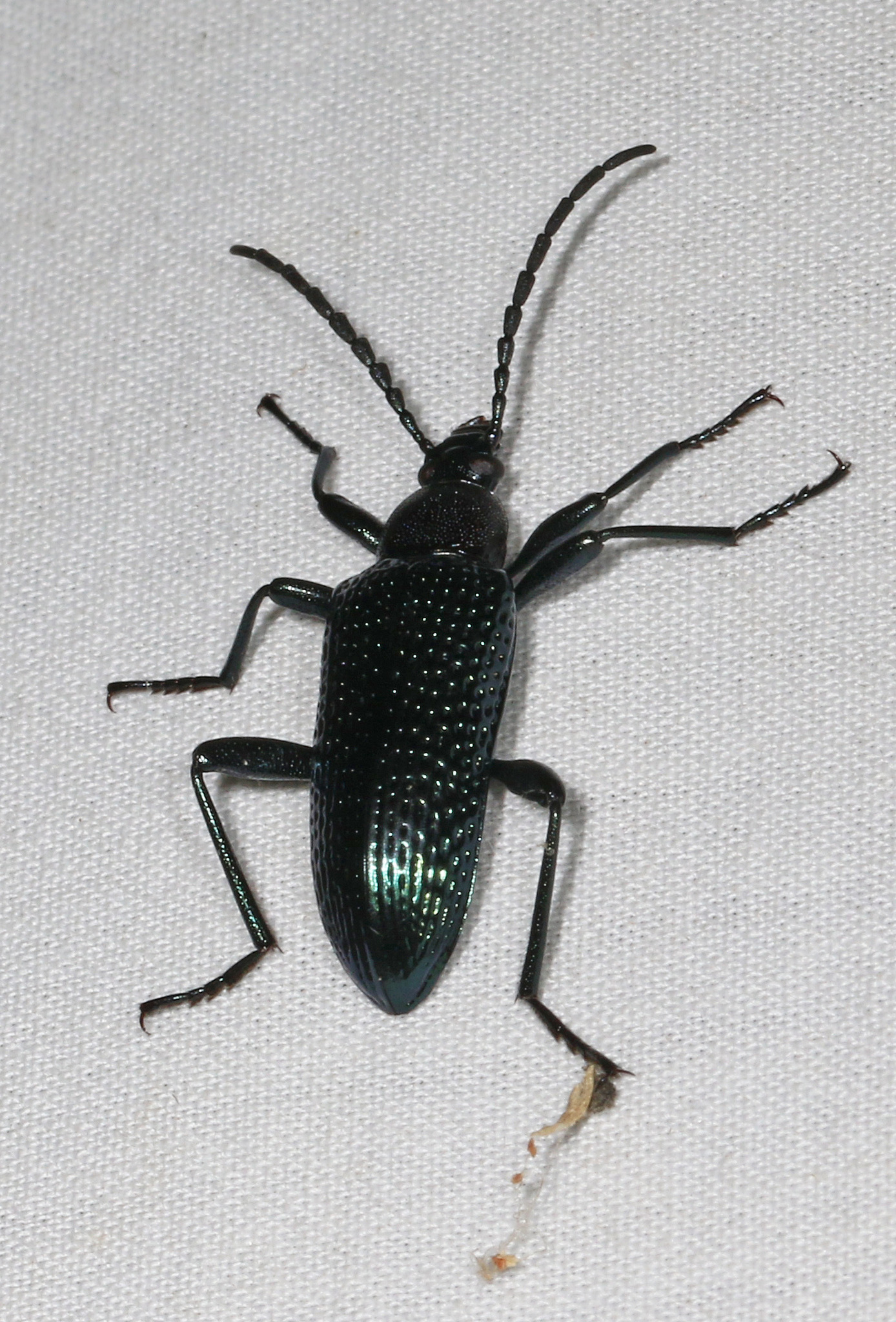

Scientific classification
- Domain: Eukaryota
- Kingdom: Animalia
- Phylum: Arthropoda
- Class: Insecta
- Order: Coleoptera
- Suborder: Polyphaga
- Infraorder: Cucujiformia
- Family: Tenebrionidae
- Subfamily: Tenebrioninae
- Tribe: Praeugenini; De Moor, 1970

= Praeugenini =

Tribe of beetles

Praeugenini is a tribe of darkling beetles in the family Tenebrionidae. There are about seven genera in Praeugenini, found in tropical Africa.

== Genera ==
These genera belong to the tribe Praeugenini:

- Anarmostodera Fairmaire, 1897
- Dysgena Mäklin, 1863
- Miltoprepes Gerstaecker, 1871
- Nesogena Mäklin, 1863
- Phaeostolus Fairmaire, 1884
- Praeugena Laporte, 1840
- Pseudopraeugena De Moor, 1970
