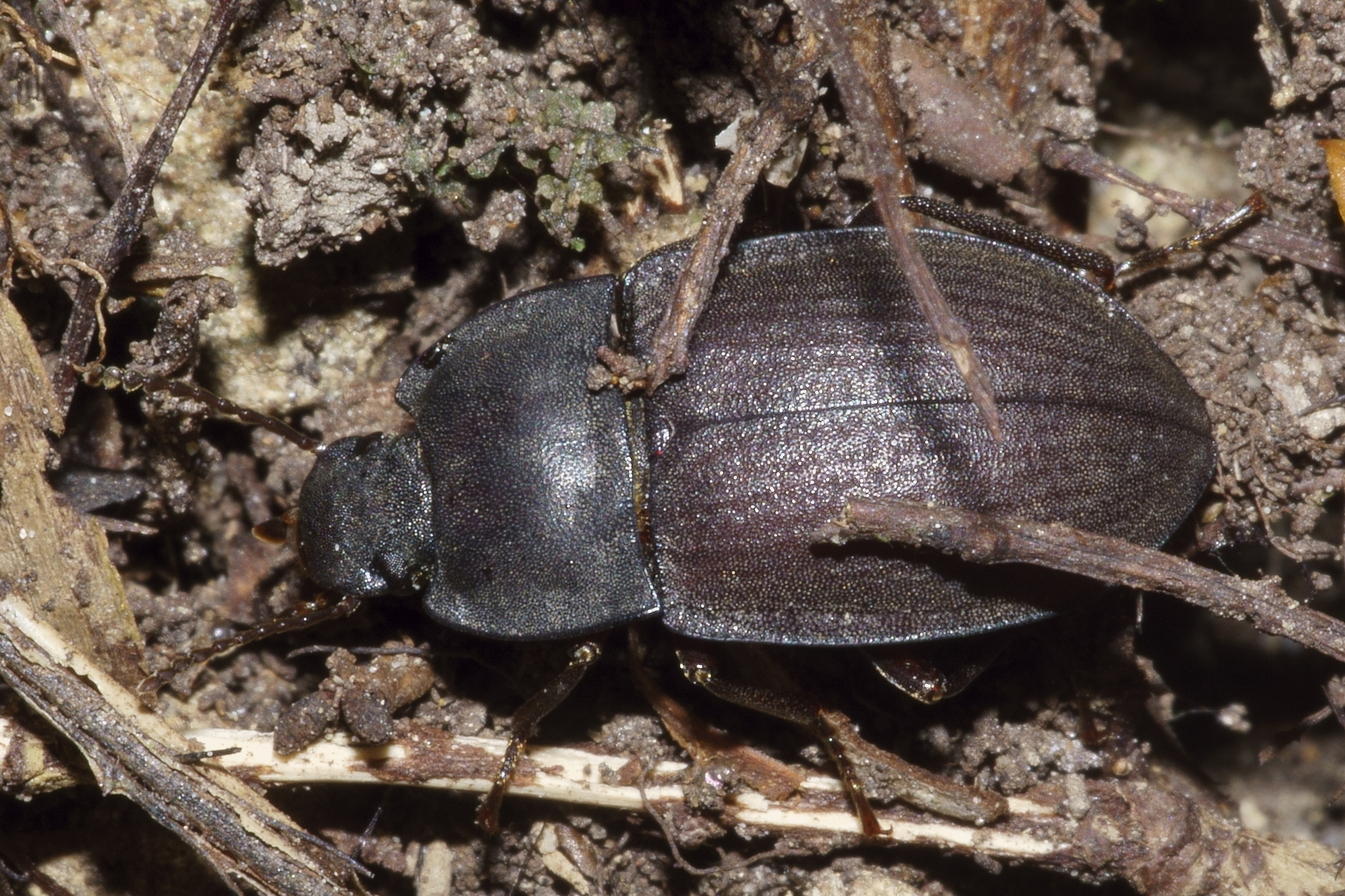
- Mimopeus opaculus, New Zealand

Scientific classification
- Domain: Eukaryota
- Kingdom: Animalia
- Phylum: Arthropoda
- Class: Insecta
- Order: Coleoptera
- Suborder: Polyphaga
- Infraorder: Cucujiformia
- Family: Tenebrionidae
- Subfamily: Tenebrioninae
- Tribe: Heleini; Fleming, 1821

Subtribes
- Asphalina Matthews & Lawrence, 2005; Cyphaleina Lacordaire, 1859; Heleina Fleming, 1821

= Heleini =

Tribe of beetles

Heleini is a tribe of darkling beetles in the family Tenebrionidae. There are more than 40 genera in Heleini, found in Australasia.

== Genera ==
These genera belong to the tribe Heleini:

- Agastenes R. Lucas, 1920
- Aglypta Gebien, 1908
- Amarygmimus Bates, 1873
- Amphianax Bates, 1873
- Asphalus Pascoe, 1868
- Atoreuma Gebien, 1941
- Bassianus Matthews & Doyen, 1989
- Bolbophanes Carter, 1913
- Boreosaragus Matthews, 1993
- Brises Pascoe, 1869
- Byallius Pascoe, 1869
- Camponotiphilus Lea, 1914
- Celibe Boisduval, 1835
- Cerodolus Sharp, 1886
- Cillibus Matthews, 1993
- Cyphaleus Westwood, 1841
- Dysarchus Pascoe, 1866
- Edylius Champion, 1894
- Emcephalus W. Kirby, 1828
- Helea Latreille, 1804
- Hemicyclus Westwood, 1841
- Meneristes Pascoe, 1869
- Mimopeus Pascoe, 1866
- Mithippia Pascoe, 1869
- Mitrothorax Carter, 1914
- Nyctozoilus Guérin-Méneville, 1831
- Olisthaena Erichson, 1842
- Onotrichus Carter, 1911
- Ospidus Pascoe, 1866
- Pachycoelia Boisduval, 1835
- Paraphanes W.J. MacLeay, 1887
- Phanechloros Matthews & Bouchard, 2008
- Platyphanes Westwood, 1849
- Prophanes Westwood, 1849
- Pseudhelops Guérin-Méneville, 1841
- Pterohelaeus Brême, 1842
- Saragus Erichson, 1842
- Sloanea Carter, 1916
- Styrus Bates, 1873
- Sympetes Pascoe, 1866
- Trichosaragus Blackburn, 1890
