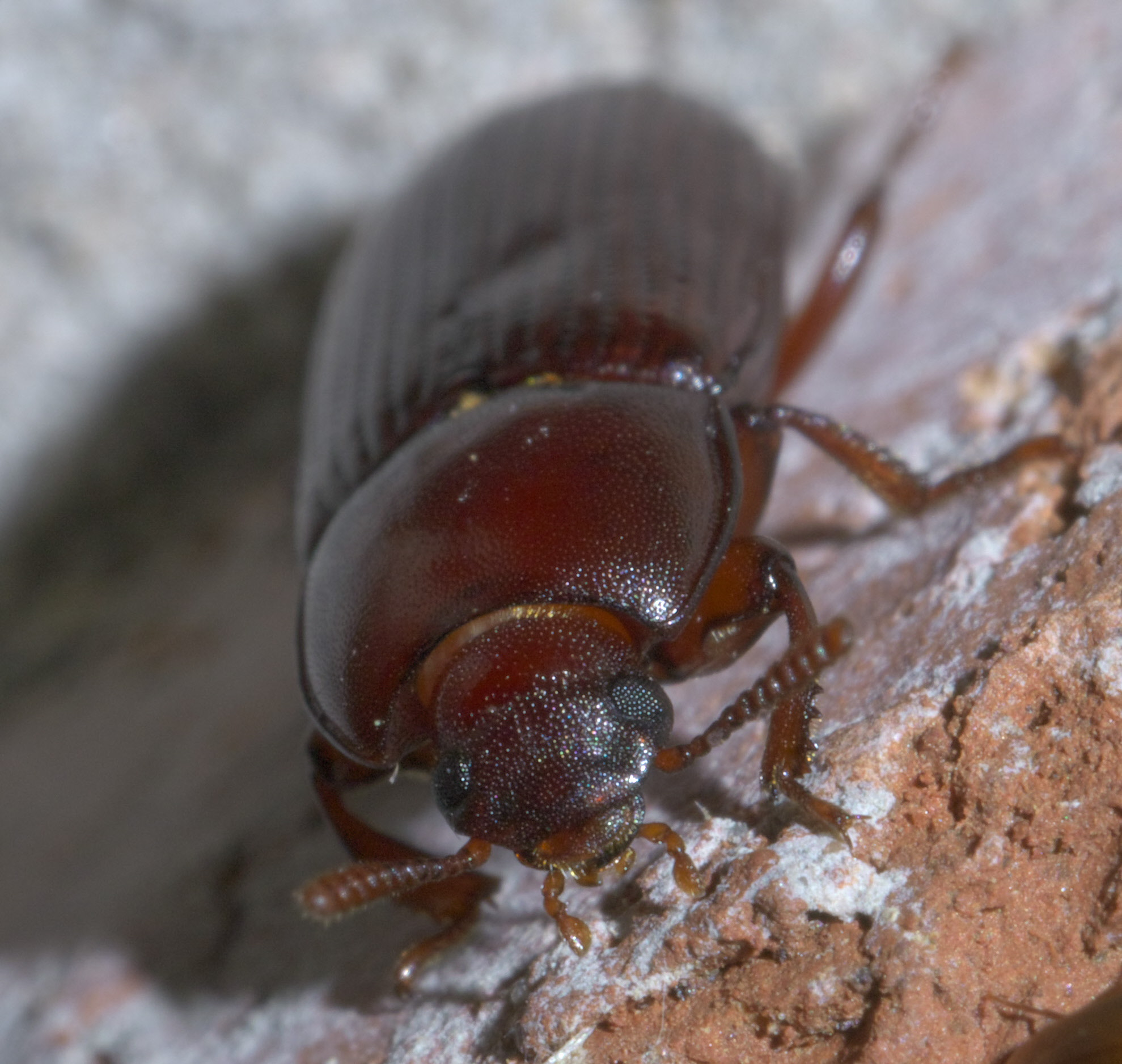
- Uloma

Scientific classification
- Kingdom: Animalia
- Phylum: Arthropoda
- Class: Insecta
- Order: Coleoptera
- Suborder: Polyphaga
- Infraorder: Cucujiformia
- Family: Tenebrionidae
- Subfamily: Tenebrioninae
- Tribe: Ulomini; Blanchard, 1845

= Ulomini =

Tribe of beetles

Ulomini is a tribe of darkling beetles in the family Tenebrionidae. There are more than 20 genera among Ulomini.

== Genera ==
These genera belong to the tribe Ulomini:

- Achthosus Pascoe, 1863 (Australasia)
- Alegoria Laporte, 1840 (the Neotropics)
- Antimachus Gistel, 1829 (the Neotropics)
- Apteruleda Gebien, 1928 (the Neotropics)
- Apteruloma Gebien, 1928 (the Neotropics)
- Basanopsis Gebien, 1914 (Indomalaya)
- Brachypophlaeus Fairmaire, 1897 (the Palearctic, tropical Africa, and Indomalaya)
- Cenoscelis Wollaston, 1868 (the Palearctic, tropical Africa, Indomalaya, and Australasia)
- Cneocnemis Gebien, 1914 (the Palearctic, Indomalaya, and Australasia)
- Curtopeltoides Pic, 1916 (Indomalaya)
- Donisiellus Bremer, 1992 (tropical Africa)
- Eutochia Leconte, 1862 (North America and the Neotropics)
- Macruloma Pic, 1921 (Indomalaya)
- Metabolocerus Bates, 1873 (the Neotropics)
- Microcenoscelis Schawaller, 2015 (tropical Africa)
- Neooligocara Guerrero, Vidal & Moore, 2007 (the Neotropics)
- Neopsectropus Kaszab, 1941 (tropical Africa)
- Oligocara Solier, 1848 (the Neotropics)
- Pheres Champion, 1886 (the Neotropics)
- Pycnuloma Fairmaire, 1896 (Indomalaya)
- Scotochares Boheman, 1858 (Oceania)
- Semieutochia Kaszab, 1980 (Indomalaya)
- Typhluloma Lea, 1912 (Australasia)
- Uleda Laporte, 1840 (the Neotropics)
- Uloma Dejean, 1821 (worldwide)
- Ulomimus Bates, 1873 (the Palearctic and Indomalaya)
