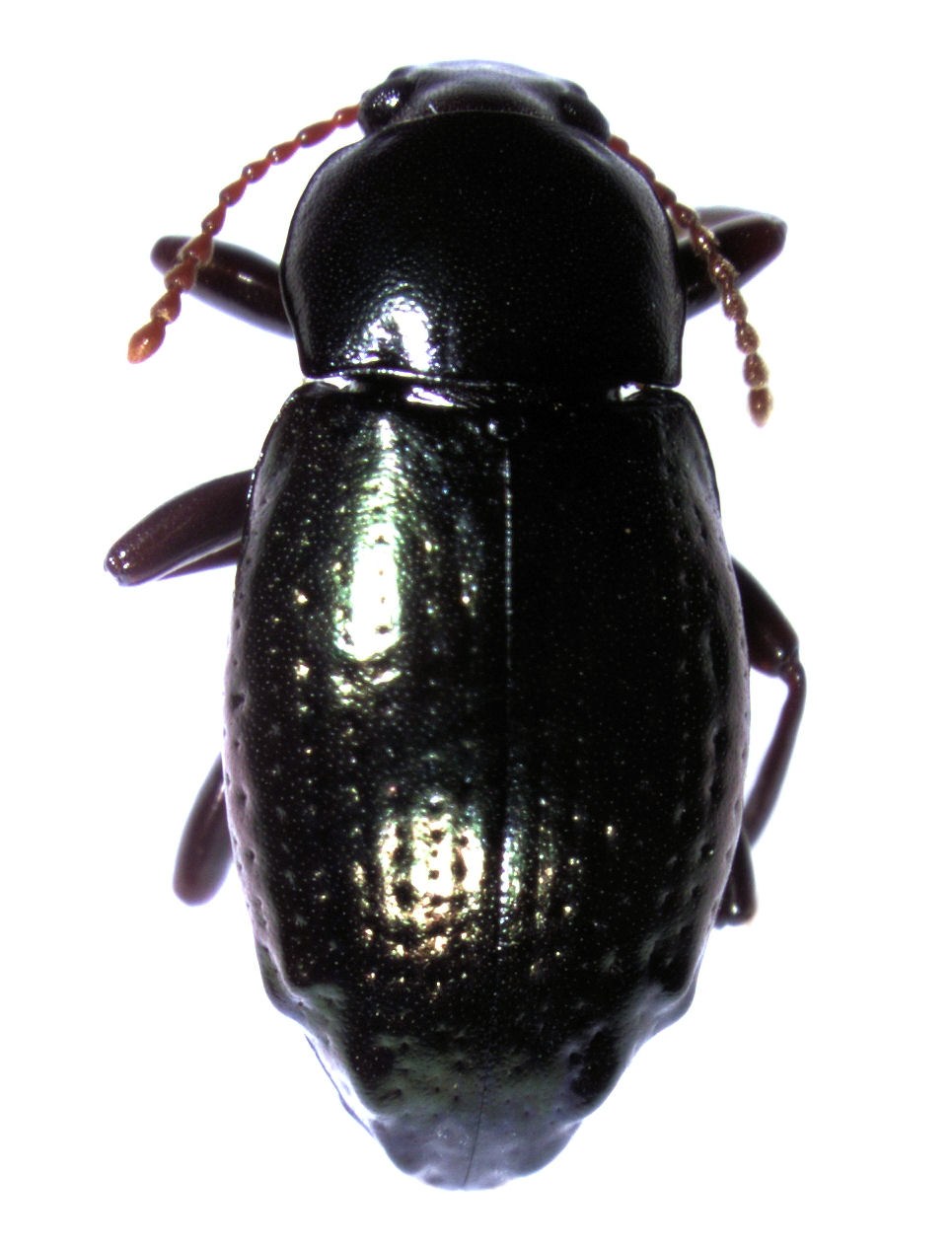
- Cerodolus tuberculatus

Scientific classification
- Domain: Eukaryota
- Kingdom: Animalia
- Phylum: Arthropoda
- Class: Insecta
- Order: Coleoptera
- Suborder: Polyphaga
- Infraorder: Cucujiformia
- Family: Tenebrionidae
- Subfamily: Tenebrioninae
- Tribe: Titaenini; Fauvel, 1905

= Titaenini =

Tribe of beetles

Titaenini is a tribe of darkling beetles in the family Tenebrionidae. There are at least eight genera recognised in the tribe Titaenini, all found in Australasia.

== Genera ==
These genera belong to the tribe Titaenini:

- Artystona Bates, 1874
- Callismilax Bates, 1874
- Cerodolus Sharp, 1886
- Demtrius Broun, 1895
- Leaus Matthews & Lawrence, 1992
- Partystona Watt, 1992
- Pseudhelops Guérin-Méneville, 1841
- Titaena Erichson, 1842
