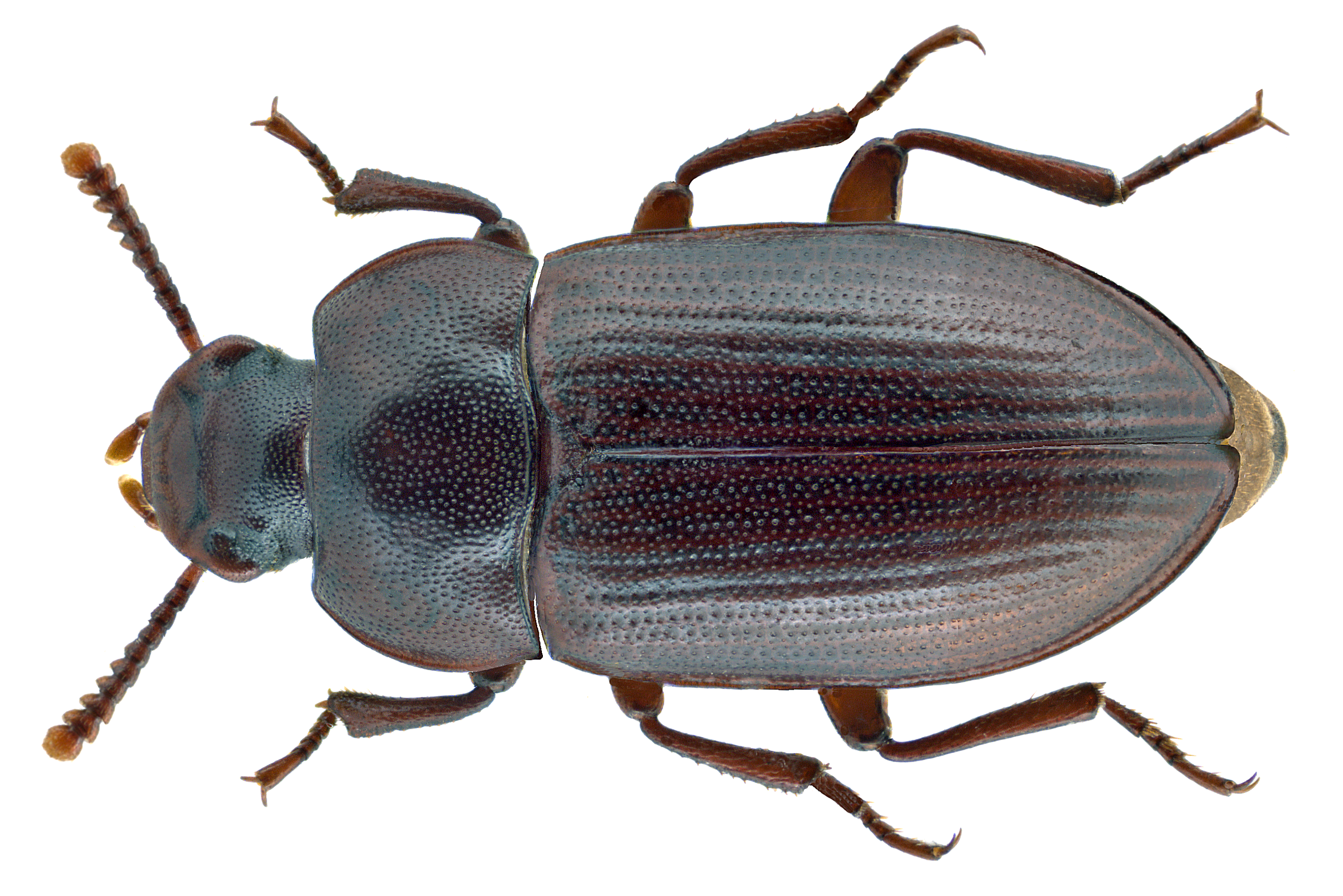

Scientific classification
- Kingdom: Animalia
- Phylum: Arthropoda
- Clade: Pancrustacea
- Class: Insecta
- Order: Coleoptera
- Suborder: Polyphaga
- Infraorder: Cucujiformia
- Family: Tenebrionidae
- Genus: Alphitobius
- Species: A. laevigatus

Binomial name
- Alphitobius laevigatus (Fabricius, 1781)

= Alphitobius laevigatus =

Species of beetle

Alphitobius laevigatus, the black fungus beetle, is a species of darkling beetle in the family Tenebrionidae. It is found in Europe and North America.

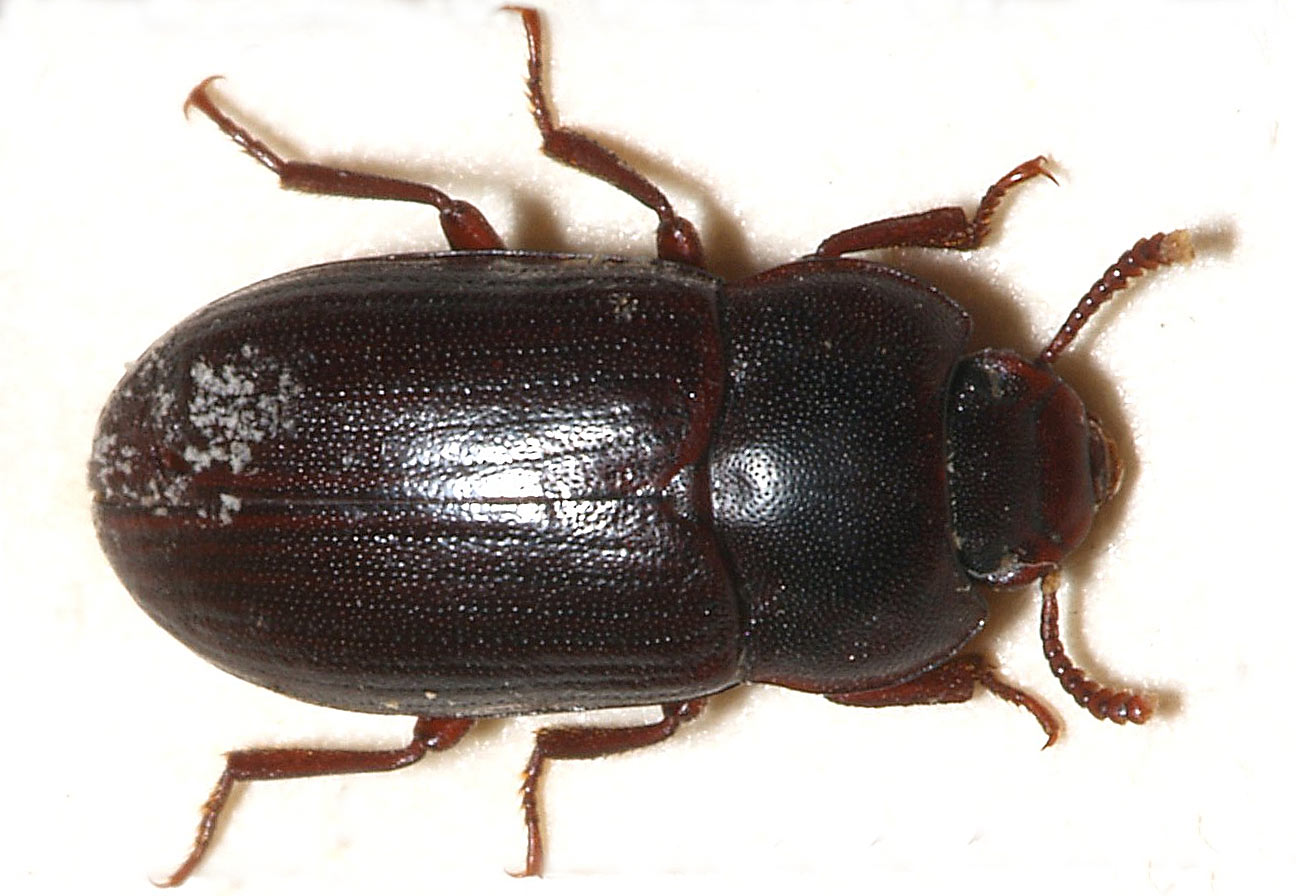
Black fungus beetle, Alphitobius laevigatus

== Use ==
A. laevigatus is bred in large quantities for the use as feed for captive birds, reptiles, or amphibians. The larvae reach a length of up to 15 millimeters. The larvae are often marketed under the trade name buffalo worms, a name that is also used for the larvae of Alphitobius diaperinus which can lead to confusion. The species can be detected using the PCR method. In difference to A. diaperinus, A. laevigatus is not used or discussed as food for human consumption.
