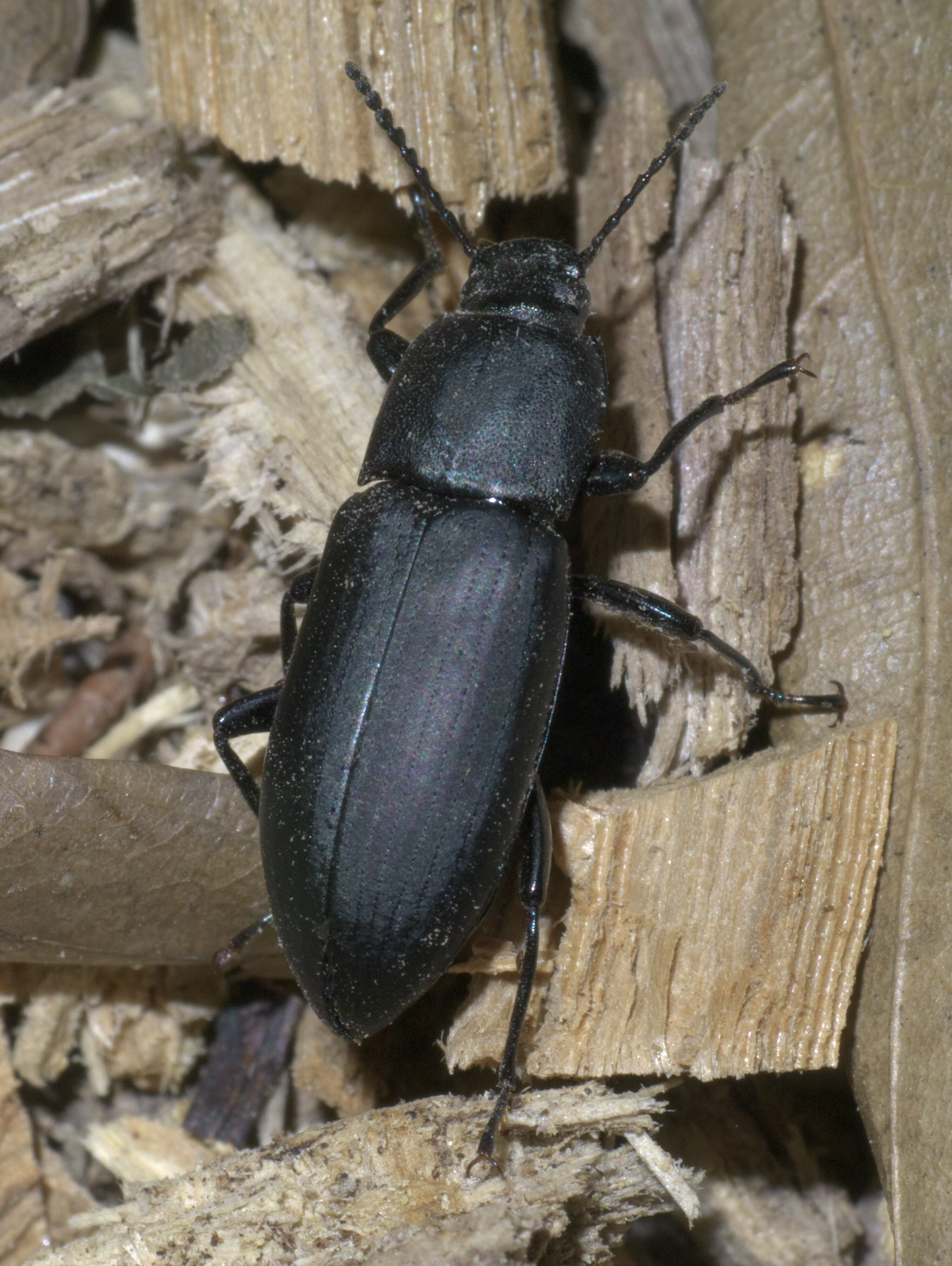
- Centronopus opacus, Oklahoma

Scientific classification
- Domain: Eukaryota
- Kingdom: Animalia
- Phylum: Arthropoda
- Class: Insecta
- Order: Coleoptera
- Suborder: Polyphaga
- Infraorder: Cucujiformia
- Family: Tenebrionidae
- Subfamily: Tenebrioninae
- Tribe: Centronopini; Doyen, 1989

= Centronopini =

Tribe of beetles

Centronopini is a tribe of darkling beetles in the family Tenebrionidae. There are at least three genera in Centronopini.

== Genera ==
These genera belong to the tribe Centronopini:

- Centronopus Solier, 1848 (North America and the Neotropics)
- Scotobaenus Leconte, 1859 (North America)
- Tauroceras Hope, 1841 (the Neotropics)
