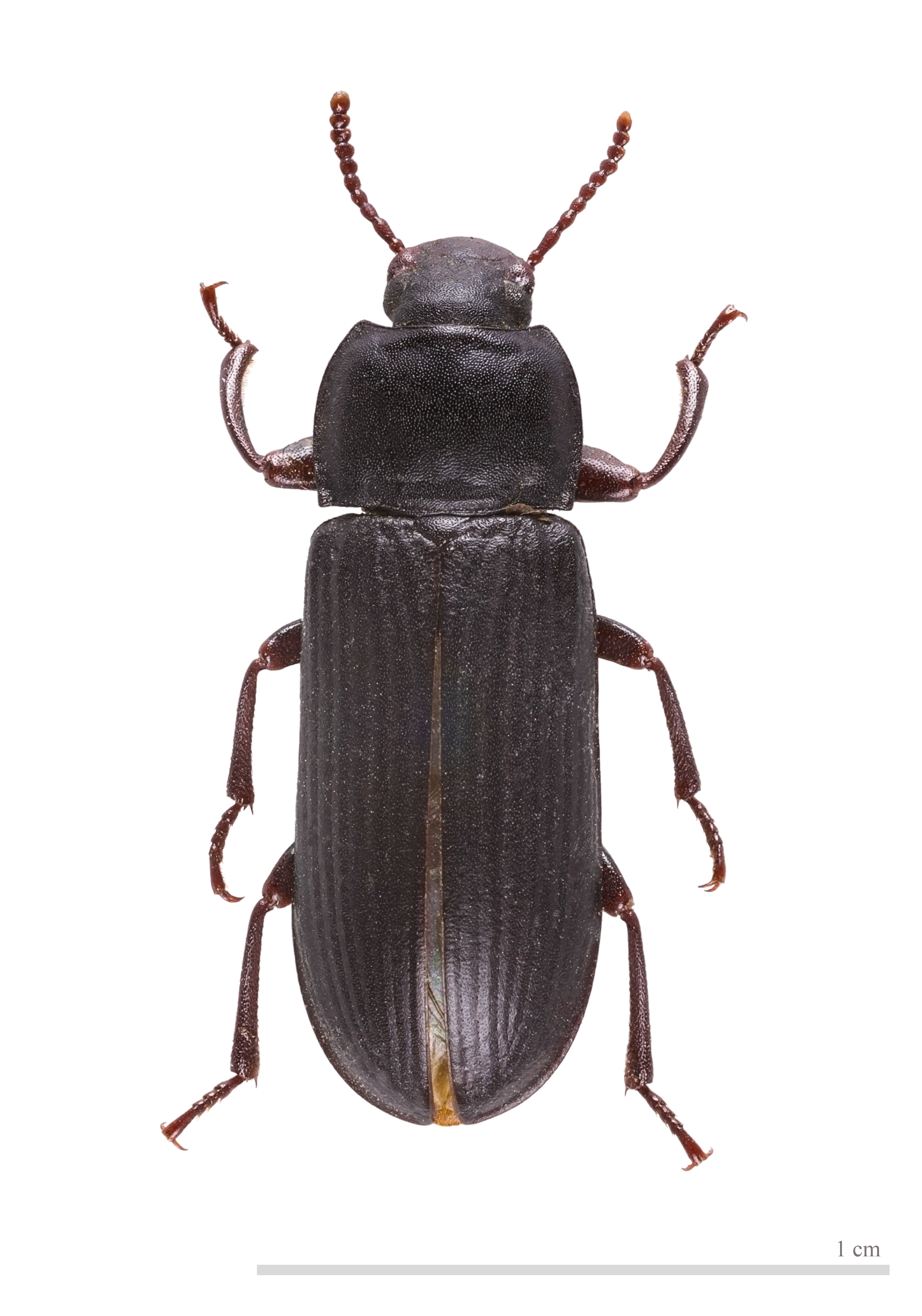
- Tenebrio molitor

Scientific classification
- Kingdom: Animalia
- Phylum: Arthropoda
- Clade: Pancrustacea
- Class: Insecta
- Order: Coleoptera
- Suborder: Polyphaga
- Infraorder: Cucujiformia
- Family: Tenebrionidae
- Subfamily: Tenebrioninae; Latreille, 1802

Tribes
- Around 20-30, see text

= Tenebrioninae =

Subfamily of beetles

Tenebrioninae is the largest subfamily of the darkling beetles (Tenebrionidae), containing flour beetles, among others. Tenebrioninae contains more than 20 tribes.

== Description ==
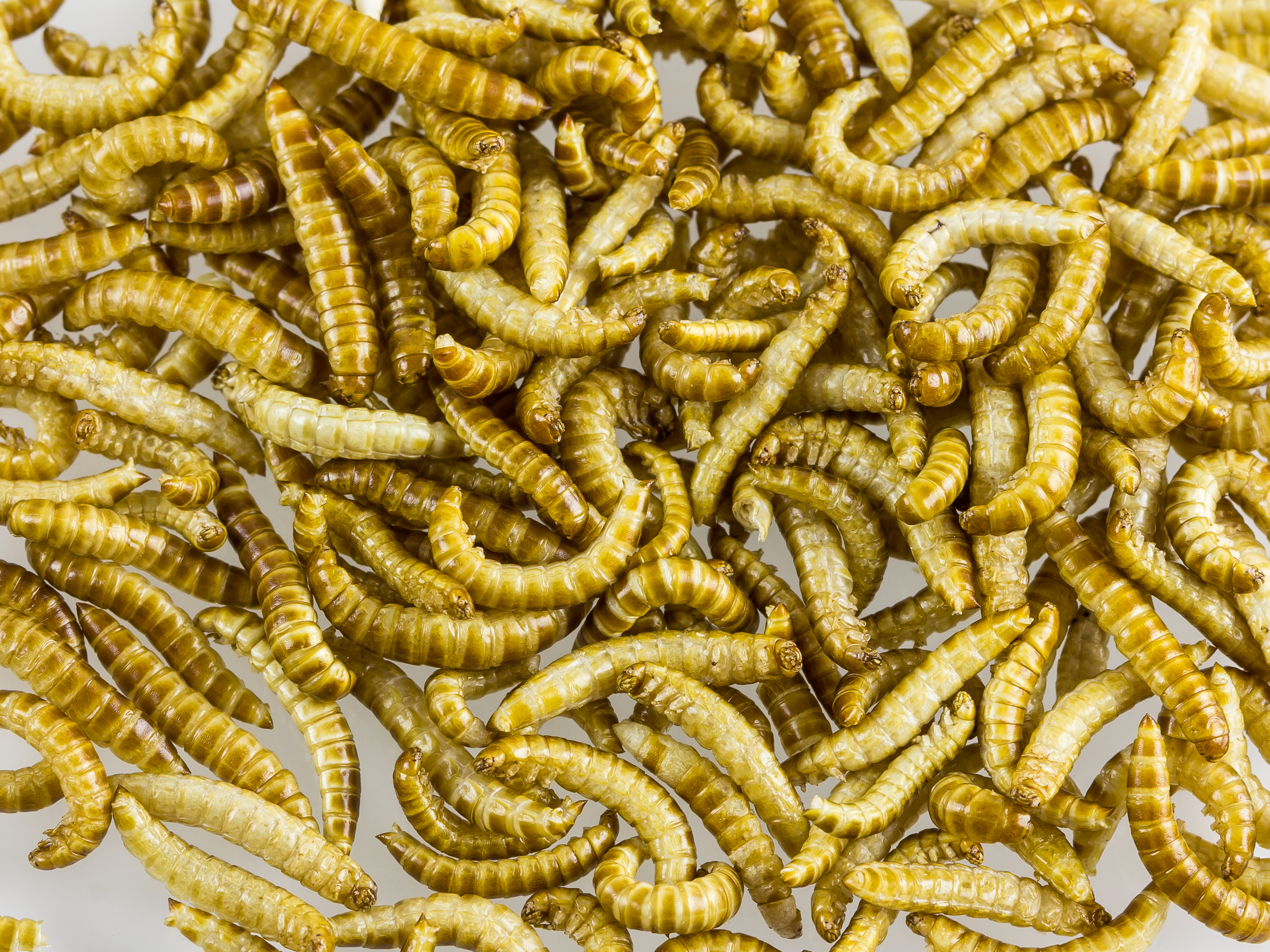
Larvae of Alphitobius laevigatus (Alphitobiini)

=== Adults ===
Adults are robust, mid-sized beetles that typically have elytra with some sort of corrugation on the upper side. They are typically black, dark brown or grey, and often have a satiny sheen. The body is shaped like a medication capsule or like a bullet; the legs can be short and stout or long and spindly. They eat both fresh and decaying vegetation, including vegetable produce, and several are commercially important pests of flour and other cereal products.

The subfamily has been characterized as adults having mandibles with the back opposite the cutting edge, without margination and excavated opposite the molar pait; having ocelli arranged in two transverse, crescent shaped or circular groups on each side of head, and with five more or less fused lenses; having antennae with basal articles noticeably longer than wide; having pygidium that is apically bicomute; and having abdominal spiracles that are oval and transverse, among other characteristics.

=== Larvae ===
Larvae of the tenebrioninae subfamily take after most other tenebrionid larvae: usually cylindrical to slightly flattened, occasionally short and broad, or strongly flattened. The head and all visible tergites or only the head and abdominal apex are heavily sclerotized.

Diagnostic characters for larvae include the presence of a frontoclypeal suture, flat and dome-like antennal sensorium, simple malar apex which is not cleft, simple ninth sternum, annular or annular- multiforous spiracles, and the absence of an endocarina, mandibular prostheca, hypostomal rods, ventral prolegs, and patches or rows of tergal asperites.

== Notable species ==
Larvae of the yellow mealworm beetle (Tenebrio molitor) are commonly used as feeder insects for reptiles and amphibians. Other Tenebrio and Tribolium species are also bred as animal food. The red flour beetle (Tribolium castaneum) is a popular genetics model organism, especially in studies of intragenomic conflict and population ecology.

Several species of Tenebrio and Tribolium, such as the confused flour beetle (T. confusum) and T. destructor, and other genera such as Gnathocerus cornutus, are pests of cereal and flour silos and other storage facilities.

== Systematics ==
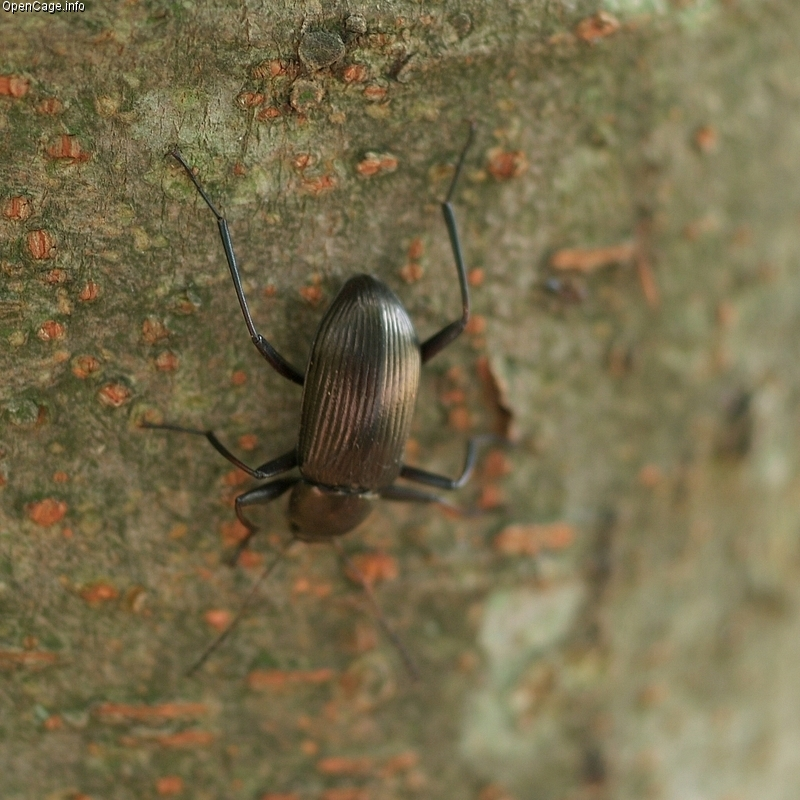
Amarygmini: Plesiophthalmus nigrocyaneus

Blaptini: Blaps cf. mucronata

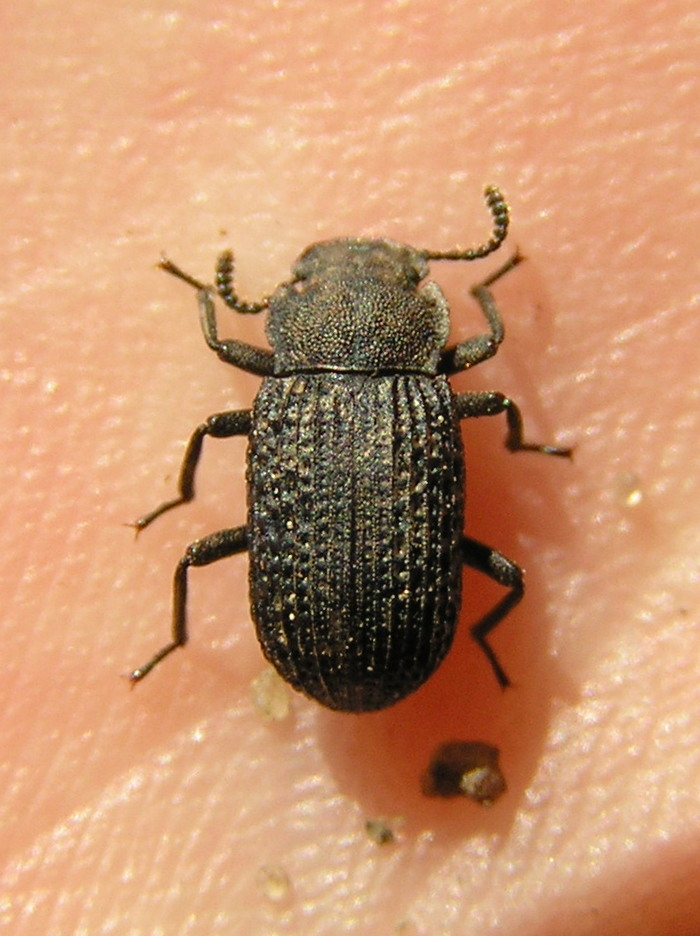
Bolitophagini: Bolitophagus reticulatus

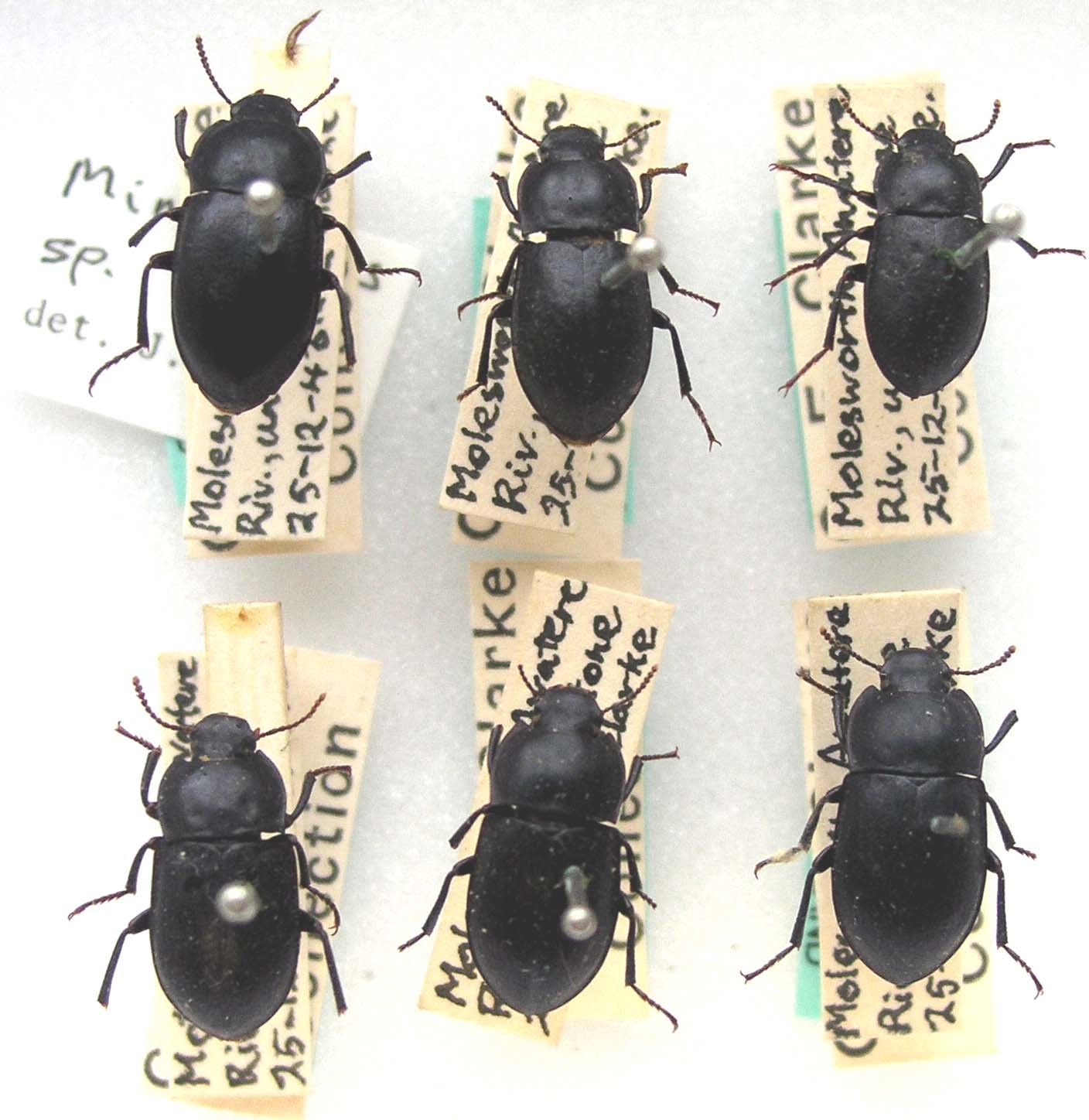
Mimopeus parvus

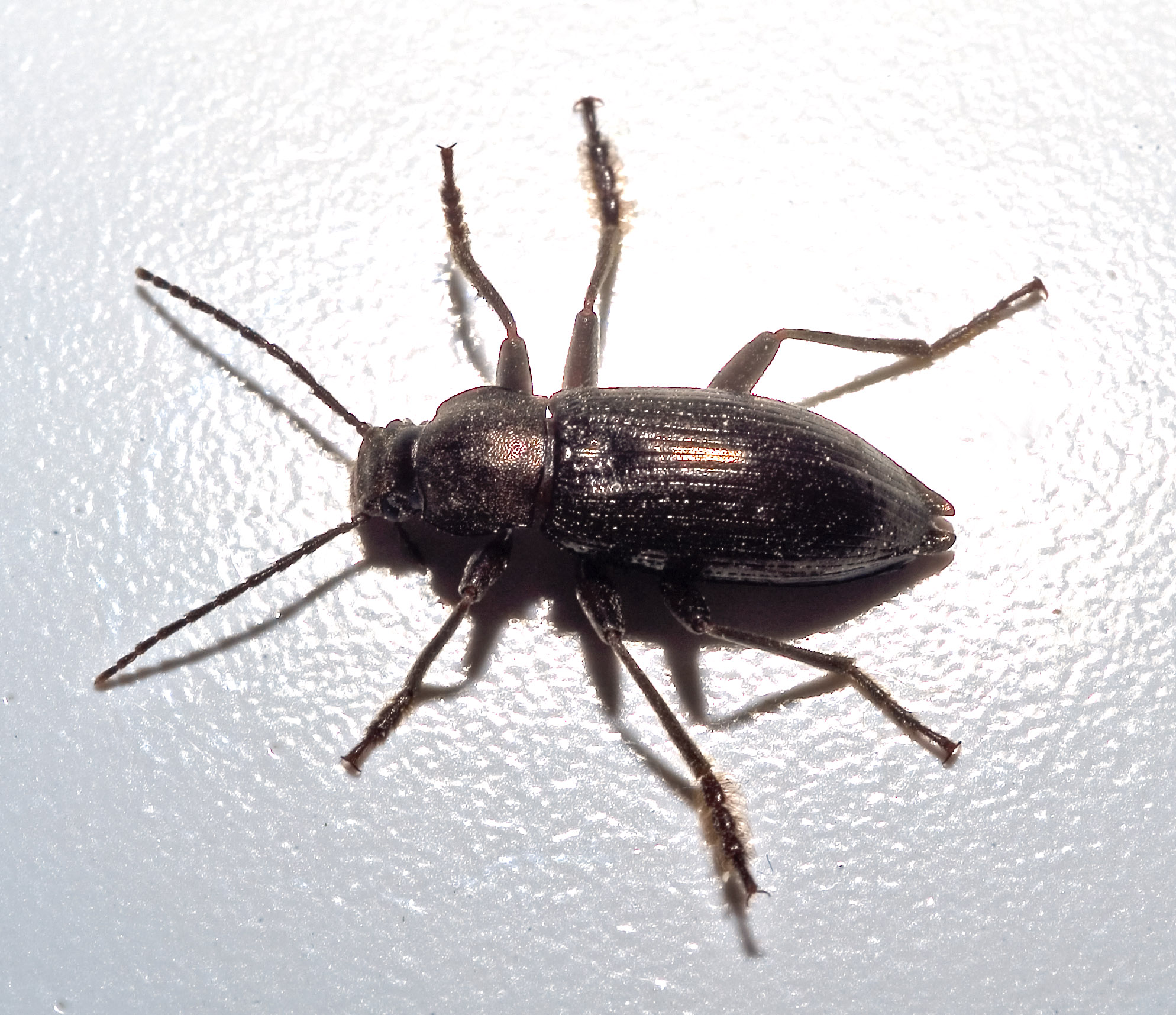
Helopini: Stenomax aeneus

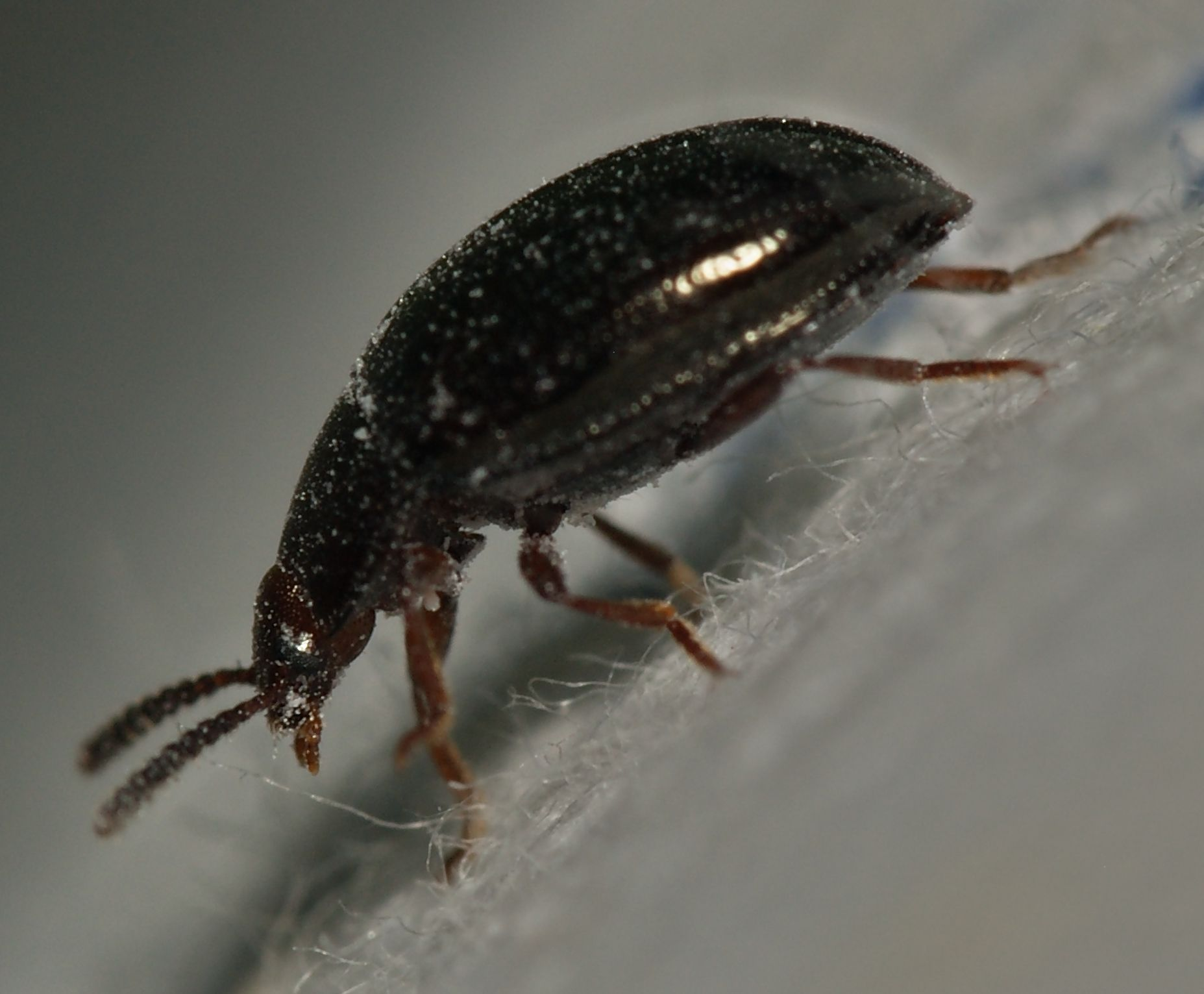
Scaphidemini: Scaphidema metallicum

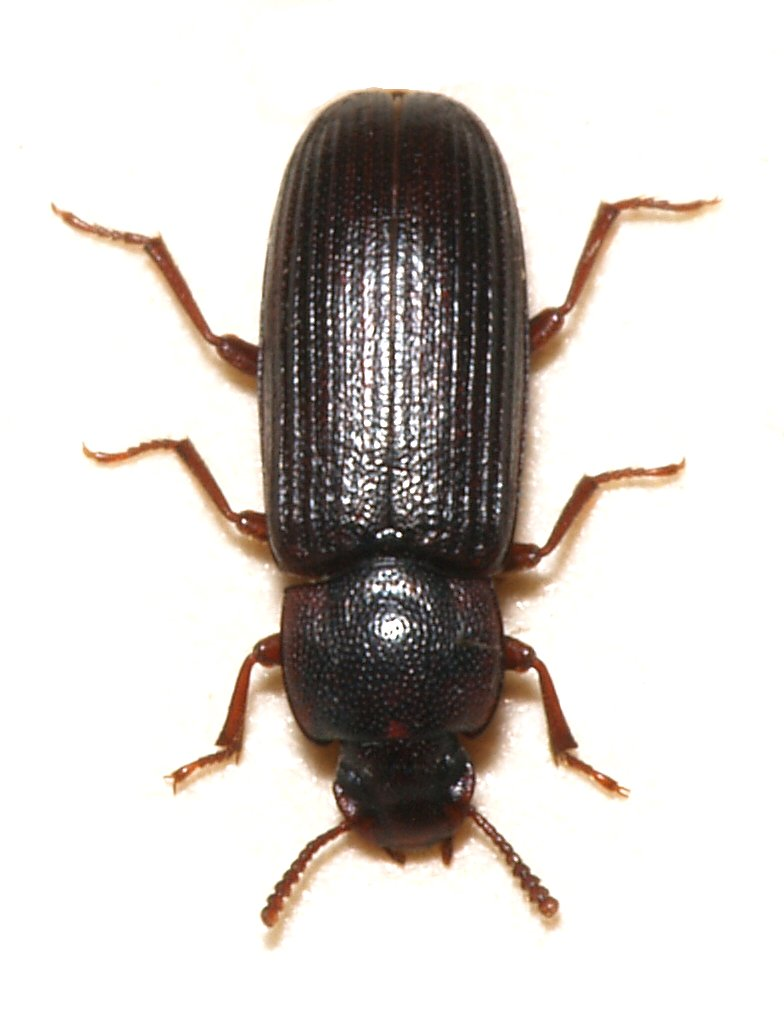
Triboliini: Tribolium destructor

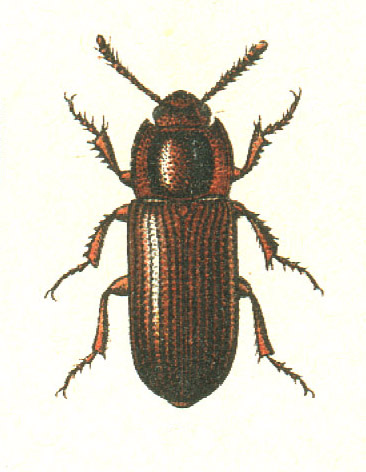
Ulomini: Uloma culinaris

The Tenebrioninae are traditionally divided in some 20-30 tribes. The exact delimitation and validity of several of these is unclear. Molecular phylogenetic studies have yielded inconsistent results, perhaps due to hybridization, horizontal gene transfer by Wolbachia bacteria, and insufficient taxon sampling obfuscating the information contained in DNA sequence data.

In some treatments, the Pimeliinae are included as yet another tribe. This may be correct, but as far as can be told they are a closely related but well distinct lineage of Tenebrionidae. The Opatrini are sometimes elevated to familial rank as Opatrinae. The Crypticini, Pentaphyllini, and Scaphidemini are sometimes placed here, but are more commonly located in the Diaperinae.

In research by Kamiński et al. published in 2021, the following tribes were moved from Tenebrioninae into the newly resurrected subfamily Blaptinae. These tribes contained 281 genera and about 4000 species, about 50% of Tenebrioninae. The new classification was followed by Bouchard et al. the same year.

- Amphidorini LeConte, 1862
- Blaptini Leach, 1815
- Dendarini Mulsant & Rey, 1854
- Opatrini Brullé, 1832
- Pedinini Eschscholtz, 1829
- Platynotini Mulsant & Rey, 1853
- Platyscelidini Lacordaire, 1859

The resulting Tenebrioninae, according to "Review of genus-group names in the family Tenebrionidae" (Bouchard et al. 2021), includes the following tribes:

- Acropteronini Doyen, 1989
- Alphitobiini Reitter, 1917
- Amarygmini Gistel, 1848
- Apocryphini Lacordaire, 1859
- Bolitophagini W. Kirby, 1837
- Centronopini Doyen, 1989
- Cerenopini Horn, 1870
- Dissonomini G.S. Medvedev, 1968
- Eulabini Horn, 1870
- Falsocossyphini Ferrer, 2006
- Heleini Fleming, 1821
- Helopini Latreille, 1802
- Melanimonini Seidlitz, 1894 (1854)
- Metaclisini Steiner, 2016
- Palorini Matthews, 2003
- Paoligenini Ferrer, 2013
- Praeugenini De Moor, 1970
- Rhysopaussini Wasmann, 1896
- Scaurini Billberg, 1820
- Scotobiini Solier, 1838
- Tenebrionini Latreille, 1802
- Titaenini Fauvel, 1905
- Toxicini Oken, 1843
- Trachelostenini Lacordaire, 1859
- Triboliini Gistel, 1848
- Ulomini Blanchard, 1845

In addition, the following genera are of uncertain placement in this subfamily:

- Anophthalmolamus Ferrer, 1993
- Hangaya Matthews & Merkl, 2015
- Nycterinus Eschscholtz, 1829
- Penichrus Champion, 1885
