= List of Blaptinae genera =

These genera belong to Blaptinae, a subfamily of darkling beetles in the family Tenebrionidae.

== Blaptinae genera ==
- Ablapsis Reitter, 1887 (the Palearctic)
- Aconobius Casey, 1895 (North America)
- Adamus Iwan, 1997 (Indomalaya)
- Adavius Mulsant & Rey, 1859 (the Palearctic and Indomalaya)
- Adoryacus Koch, 1963 (tropical Africa)
- Agnaptoria Reitter, 1887 (the Palearctic)
- Alaetrinus Iwan, 1995 (North America and the Neotropics)
- Allophylax Bedel, 1906 (the Palearctic)
- Amathobius Gebien, 1920 (tropical Africa)
- Amatodes Dejean, 1834 (tropical Africa)
- Amblychirus Koch, 1956 (tropical Africa)
- Amblysphagus Fairmaire, 1896 (tropical Africa and Indomalaya)
- Ametrocera Fåhraeus, 1870 (tropical Africa)
- Ammidium Erichson, 1843 (tropical Africa)
- Ammobius Guérin-Méneville, 1844 (the Palearctic and Indomalaya)
- Ammodonus Mulsant & Rey, 1859 (North America and the Neotropics)
- Amphithrixoides Bouchard & Löbl, 2008 (the Palearctic)
- Anatrum Reichardt, 1936 (the Palearctic)
- Anaxius Fåhraeus, 1870 (tropical Africa)
- Anchophthalmops Koch, 1956 (North America and Indomalaya)
- Anchophthalmus Gerstaecker, 1854 (tropical Africa)
- Angolositus Koch, 1955 (tropical Africa)
- Anomalipus Guérin-Méneville, 1831 (tropical Africa)
- Apsheronellus Bogatchev, 1967 (the Palearctic)
- Aptila Fåhraeus, 1870 (tropical Africa)
- Arabammobius Grimm & Lillig, 2020 (the Palearctic and tropical Africa)
- Asidoblaps Fairmaire, 1886 (the Palearctic and Indomalaya)
- Asidodema Koch, 1958 (tropical Africa)
- Asiocaedius G.S. Medvedev & Nepesova, 1985 (the Palearctic)
- Atrocrates Koch, 1956 (tropical Africa)
- Atrocrypticanus Iwan, 1999 (tropical Africa)
- Austrocaribius Marcuzzi, 1954 (the Neotropics)
- Bantodemus Koch, 1955 (tropical Africa)
- Belousovia G.S. Medvedev, 2007 (the Palearctic)
- Bermejoina Español, 1944 (the Palearctic)
- Bioplanes Mulsant, 1854 (the Palearctic)
- Bioramix Bates, 1879 (the Palearctic)
- Blacodatus Koch, 1963 (tropical Africa)
- Blaps Fabricius, 1775 (North America, tropical Africa, Indomalaya, Australasia, and Oceania)
- Blapstinus Dejean, 1821 (North America, the Neotropics, and Oceania)
- Blaptogonia G.S. Medvedev, 1998 (the Palearctic and Indomalaya)
- Blastarnodes Koch, 1958 (tropical Africa)
- Blenosia Laporte, 1840 (tropical Africa)
- Brachyesthes Fairmaire, 1868 (the Palearctic and Indomalaya)
- Brachyidium Fairmaire, 1883 (Indomalaya, Australasia, and Oceania)
- Bradyus Dejean, 1834 (the Palearctic)
- Byrrhoncus Koch, 1954 (tropical Africa)
- Cabirutus Strand, 1929 (the Palearctic and Indomalaya)
- Caediexis Lebedev, 1932 (the Palearctic)
- Caediomorpha Blackburn, 1888 (Australasia)
- Caedius Blanchard, 1845 (the Palearctic, tropical Africa, Indomalaya, and Australasia)
- Calaharena Koch, 1963 (tropical Africa)
- Capidium Koch, 1954 (tropical Africa)
- Caraboblaps Bauer, 1921*
- Cenophorus Mulsant & Rey, 1859 (the Neotropics)
- Clastopus Fairmaire, 1898 (tropical Africa)
- Claudegirardius Iwan, 1999 (tropical Africa)
- Clitobius Mulsant & Rey, 1859 (the Palearctic and tropical Africa)
- Coelocnemodes Bates, 1879 (Indomalaya)
- Coeloecetes Blair, 1929 (Indomalaya)
- Colasia Koch, 1965 (the Palearctic)
- Colophonesthes Koch, 1954 (tropical Africa)
- Colpotinoides Kaszab, 1975 (tropical Africa)
- Colpotinus Fairmaire, 1891 (the Palearctic)
- Conibiosoma Casey, 1890 (North America)
- Conibius LeConte, 1851 (North America, the Neotropics, and Oceania)
- Corinta Koch, 1950 (tropical Africa)
- Cornopterus Koch, 1950 (tropical Africa)
- Crististibes Koch, 1963 (tropical Africa)
- Crypticanus Fairmaire, 1897 (tropical Africa)
- Cybotus Casey, 1890 (the Neotropics)
- Cyptus Gerstaecker, 1871 (the Palearctic and tropical Africa)
- Dendarophylan Español, 1945 (the Palearctic)
- Dendarus Dejean, 1821 (the Palearctic)
- Diaderma Koch, 1960 (tropical Africa)
- Diastolinus Mulsant & Rey, 1859 (the Neotropics)
- Diestecopus Solier, 1848 (tropical Africa)
- Dila Fischer von Waldheim, 1844 (the Palearctic)
- Dilablaps Bogatchev, 1976 (the Palearctic)
- Dilamus Jacquelin du Val, 1861 (the Palearctic and tropical Africa)
- Diphyrrhynchus Fairmaire, 1849 (the Palearctic, tropical Africa, Indomalaya, Australasia, and Oceania)
- Dissonomus Jacquelin du Val, 1861 (the Palearctic)
- Doyenus Iwan, 1996 (tropical Africa)
- Drosochrus Erichson, 1843 (the Palearctic and tropical Africa)
- Ectateus Koch, 1956 (tropical Africa)
- Eichleria Kaminski, 2015 (tropical Africa)
- Eleodes Eschscholtz, 1829 (desert stink beetles) (North America and the Neotropics)
- Eleodimorpha Blaisdell, 1909 (North America)
- Eleoselinus Kaminski, 2014 (tropical Africa)
- Embaphion Say, 1824 (North America)
- Emmalus Erichson, 1843 (tropical Africa)
- Ephalus LeConte, 1862 (North America and the Neotropics)
- Eremostibes Koch, 1963 (tropical Africa)
- Eucolus Mulsant & Rey, 1853 (Indomalaya)
- Eumylada Reitter, 1904 (the Palearctic)
- Eurycaulus Fairmaire, 1868 (the Palearctic and tropical Africa)
- Eurynotus W. Kirby, 1819 (tropical Africa)
- Eviropodus Koch, 1956 (tropical Africa)
- Falsammidium Koch, 1960 (tropical Africa)
- Falsocaedius Español, 1943 (the Palearctic)
- Falsolobodera Kaszab, 1967 (the Palearctic)
- Freyula Koch, 1959 (tropical Africa)
- Glyptopteryx Gebien, 1910 (tropical Africa)
- Gnaptor Brullé, 1831 (the Palearctic)
- Gnaptorina Reitter, 1887 (the Palearctic and Indomalaya)
- Goajiria Ivie & Hart, 2016 (the Neotropics)
- Gonocephalum Solier, 1834 (North America, tropical Africa, Indomalaya, Australasia, and Oceania)
- Gonopus Latreille, 1828 (tropical Africa)
- Gridelliopus Koch, 1956 (tropical Africa)
- Guildia Antoine, 1957 (the Palearctic)
- Hadroderus Koch, 1956 (tropical Africa)
- Hadrodes Wollaston, 1877 (the Palearctic)
- Hadrophasis Ferrer, 1992 (tropical Africa)
- Haemodus Gebien, 1943 (tropical Africa)
- Hanstroemium Koch, 1953 (tropical Africa)
- Helenomelas Ardoin, 1972 (the Palearctic)
- Helibatus Mulsant & Rey, 1859 (tropical Africa)
- Heliopates Dejean, 1834 (the Palearctic)
- Heterocheira Dejean, 1836 (tropical Africa and Australasia)
- Heteropsectropus Kaszab, 1941 (tropical Africa)
- Heterotarsus Latreille, 1829 (the Palearctic, tropical Africa, and Indomalaya)
- Hirtograbies Koch, 1954 (tropical Africa)
- Holoblaps Bauer, 1921*
- Hoplarion Mulsant & Rey, 1854 (the Palearctic)
- Hoplitoblaps Fairmaire, 1889 (Indomalaya)
- Hovademus Iwan, 1996 (tropical Africa)
- Hovarygmus Fairmaire, 1898 (tropical Africa)
- Hummelinckia Marcuzzi, 1954 (the Neotropics)
- Isoncophallus Koch, 1954 (tropical Africa)
- Itagonia Reitter, 1887 (the Palearctic)
- Jintaium Ren, 1999 (the Palearctic)
- Lariversius Blaisdell, 1947 (North America)
- Lasioderus Mulsant & Rey, 1854 (tropical Africa)
- Lechius Iwan, 1995 (tropical Africa)
- Leichenum Dejean, 1834 (North America, the Palearctic, Indomalaya, Australasia, and Oceania)
- Litoboriolus Español, 1945 (the Palearctic)
- Litoborus Mulsant & Rey, 1854 (the Palearctic)
- Litororus Reitter, 1904 (the Palearctic)
- Loensus R. Lucas, 1920 (tropical Africa and Indomalaya)
- Luebbertia Koch, 1963 (tropical Africa)
- Madobalus Fairmaire, 1901 (tropical Africa)
- Mateuina Español, 1944 (the Palearctic)
- Medvedevia Chigray, 2019 (the Palearctic)
- Medvedevoblaps Bouchard & Bousquet, 2021 (the Palearctic)
- Meglyphus Motschulsky, 1872 (tropical Africa)
- Melambius Mulsant & Rey, 1854 (the Palearctic)
- Melanesthes Dejean, 1834 (the Palearctic)
- Melanocoma Wollaston, 1868 (tropical Africa)
- Melanocratus Fairmaire, 1895 (tropical Africa)
- Melanopterus Mulsant & Rey, 1854 (tropical Africa)
- Melansis Wollaston, 1864 (the Palearctic)
- Melasmana Strand, 1935 (the Palearctic)
- Menearchus Carter, 1920 (tropical Africa)
- Menederes Solier, 1848 (tropical Africa)
- Menederopsis Koch, 1954 (tropical Africa)
- Mesomorphus Miedel, 1880 (the Palearctic, tropical Africa, Indomalaya, Australasia, and Oceania)
- Messoricolum Koch, 1960 (tropical Africa)
- Micrantereus Solier, 1848 (the Palearctic and tropical Africa)
- Microphylacinus Iwan, Kaminski & Aalbu, 2011 (tropical Africa)
- Microplatyscelis Kaszab, 1940 (the Palearctic)
- Micrositus Mulsant & Rey, 1854 (the Palearctic)
- Microstizopus Koch, 1963 (tropical Africa)
- Minorus Mulsant & Rey, 1854 (tropical Africa)
- Monodius Koch, 1956 (tropical Africa)
- Montagona G.S. Medvedev, 1998 (the Palearctic and Indomalaya)
- Moragacinella Español, 1954 (the Palearctic)
- Muelleropsectropus Lumen & Kamiński (South Africa)
- Myatis Bates, 1879 (the Palearctic)
- Myladina Reitter, 1889 (the Palearctic)
- Nalepa Reitter, 1887 (the Palearctic)
- Namazopus Koch, 1963 (tropical Africa)
- Nemanes Fairmaire, 1888 (tropical Africa)
- Neobaphion Blaisdell, 1925 (North America)
- Neoisocerus Bouchard, Lawrence, Davies & Newton, 2005 (the Palearctic)
- Neopachypterus Bouchard, Löbl & Merkl, 2007 (the Palearctic and Indomalaya)
- Nepalindia G.S. Medvedev, 1998 (Indomalaya)
- Nesocaedius Kolbe, 1915 (the Palearctic and Indomalaya)
- Nesopatrum Gebien, 1921 (tropical Africa)
- Nevisia Marcuzzi, 1986 (the Neotropics)
- Nicandra Fairmaire, 1888 (tropical Africa)
- Nocibiotes Casey, 1895 (North America)
- Notibius LeConte, 1851 (North America)
- Notocorax Dejean, 1834 (Indomalaya)
- Nycterinus Eschscholtz, 1829 (the Neotropics)
- Ograbies Péringuey, 1899 (tropical Africa)
- Oncopteryx Gebien, 1943 (tropical Africa)
- Oncotus Blanchard, 1845 (tropical Africa)
- Oodescelis Motschulsky, 1845 (the Palearctic)
- Opatrinus Dejean, 1821 (the Neotropics)
- Opatroides Brullé, 1832 (North America, tropical Africa, Indomalaya, and Australasia)
- Opatrum Fabricius, 1775 (the Palearctic)
- Orarabion Leo & Liberto, 2011 (tropical Africa)
- Oreomelasma Español, 1975 (the Palearctic)
- Otinia Antoine, 1942 (the Palearctic)
- Pachymastus Fairmaire, 1896 (tropical Africa)
- Parabantodemus Iwan, 2000 (tropical Africa)
- Paraselinus Kaminski, 2013 (tropical Africa)
- Parastizopus Gebien, 1938 (tropical Africa)
- Pedinus Latreille, 1797 (the Palearctic and Indomalaya)
- Penthicinus Reitter, 1896 (the Palearctic)
- Penthicoides Fairmaire, 1896 (Indomalaya)
- Penthicus Faldermann, 1836 (the Palearctic and tropical Africa)
- Periblaps Bauer, 1921*
- Periloma Gebien, 1938 (tropical Africa)
- Perithrix Fairmaire, 1879 (the Palearctic)
- Peyerimhoffius Koch, 1948 (the Palearctic)
- Phaleriderma Koch, 1954 (tropical Africa)
- Phallocentrion Koch, 1956 (tropical Africa)
- Phelopatrum Marseul, 1876 (the Palearctic)
- Phylacastus Fairmaire, 1897 (tropical Africa)
- Phylacinus Fairmaire, 1896 (tropical Africa)
- Phylan Sturm, 1826 (the Palearctic)
- Phylanmania Ferrer, 2013 (the Palearctic)
- Phymatoplata Koch, 1956 (tropical Africa)
- Piscicula Robiche, 2004 (tropical Africa)
- Planostibes Gemminger, 1870 (tropical Africa)
- Platyburak Iwan, 1990 (Indomalaya)
- Platyburmanicus Iwan, 2003 (Indomalaya)
- Platycolpotus Iwan, 1997 (Indomalaya)
- Platylus Mulsant & Rey, 1859 (the Neotropics)
- Platynosum Mulsant & Rey, 1859 (the Palearctic)
- Platynotoides Kaszab, 1975 (Indomalaya)
- Platynotus Fabricius, 1801 (Indomalaya)
- Platyprocnemis Español & Lindberg, 1963 (tropical Africa)
- Platyscelis Latreille, 1818 (the Palearctic)
- Plesioderes Mulsant & Rey, 1859 (tropical Africa and Indomalaya)
- Pocadiopsis Fairmaire, 1896 (Indomalaya)
- Pokryszkiella Iwan, 1996 (tropical Africa)
- Polycoelogastridion Reichardt, 1936 (the Palearctic and Indomalaya)
- Prodilamus Ardoin, 1969 (the Palearctic and tropical Africa)
- Proscheimus Desbrochers des Loges, 1881 (the Palearctic)
- Prosodes Eschscholtz, 1829 (the Palearctic and Indomalaya)
- Protoblaps Bauer, 1921*
- Psammestus Reichardt, 1936 (the Palearctic)
- Psammoardoinellus Leo, 1981 (the Palearctic)
- Psammogaster Koch, 1953 (tropical Africa)
- Psectes Hesse, 1935 (tropical Africa)
- Psectrapus Solier, 1848 (tropical Africa)
- Pseudemmallus Koch, 1956 (tropical Africa)
- Pseudoblaps Guérin-Méneville, 1834 (the Palearctic and Indomalaya)
- Pseudognaptorina Kaszab, 1977 (the Palearctic and Indomalaya)
- Pseudolamus Fairmaire, 1874 (the Palearctic)
- Pseudoleichenum Ardoin, 1972 (tropical Africa)
- Pseudonotocorax Iwan, 1997 (Indomalaya)
- Pteroselinus Kaminski, 2015 (tropical Africa)
- Pythiopus Koch, 1953 (tropical Africa)
- Raynalius Chatanay, 1912 (tropical Africa)
- Reichardtiellina Kaszab, 1982 (the Palearctic)
- Remipedella Semenov, 1907 (the Palearctic)
- Rugoplatynotus Kaszab, 1975 (Indomalaya)
- Schelodontes Koch, 1956 (tropical Africa)
- Schyzoschelus Koch, 1954 (tropical Africa)
- Scleroides Fairmaire, 1883 (Australasia)
- Scleropatroides Löbl & Merkl, 2003 (the Palearctic, tropical Africa, and Indomalaya)
- Scleropatrum Reitter, 1887 (the Palearctic and Indomalaya)
- Sclerum Dejean, 1834 (the Palearctic, tropical Africa, and Indomalaya)
- Scymena Pascoe, 1866 (Australasia)
- Sebastianus Iwan, 1996 (tropical Africa)
- Selenepistoma Dejean, 1834 (tropical Africa)
- Selinopodus Koch, 1956 (tropical Africa)
- Selinus Mulsant & Rey, 1853 (tropical Africa)
- Silvestriellum Koch, 1956 (tropical Africa)
- Sinorus Mulsant & Revelière, 1861 (the Palearctic)
- Sintagona G.S. Medvedev, 1998 (the Palearctic)
- Sobas Pascoe, 1863 (Australasia)
- Socotropatrum Koch, 1970 (tropical Africa)
- Somocoelia Heyden & Kraatz, 1882 (the Palearctic)
- Somocoeloplatys Skopin, 1968 (the Palearctic)
- Sphaerostibes Koch, 1963 (tropical Africa)
- Stenogonopus Gebien, 1938 (tropical Africa)
- Stenolamus Gebien, 1920 (tropical Africa)
- Stizopus Erichson, 1843 (tropical Africa)
- Stridigula Koch, 1954 (tropical Africa)
- Styphacus Fairmaire, 1901 (tropical Africa)
- Sulpius Fairmaire, 1906 (tropical Africa)
- Syntyphlus Koch, 1953 (tropical Africa)
- Tagona Fischer von Waldheim, 1820 (the Palearctic)
- Tagonoides Fairmaire, 1886 (the Palearctic)
- Tarphiophasis Wollaston, 1877 (tropical Africa)
- Thaioblaps Masumoto, 1989 (Indomalaya)
- Thaumatoblaps Kaszab & G.S. Medvedev, 1984 (the Palearctic)
- Tidiguinia Español, 1959 (the Palearctic)
- Tonibiastes Casey, 1895 (North America)
- Tonibius Casey, 1895 (North America)
- Tragardhus Koch, 1956 (tropical Africa)
- Trichomyatis Schuster, 1931 (the Palearctic)
- Trichosternum Wollaston, 1861 (tropical Africa)
- Trichoton Hope, 1841 (North America and the Neotropics)
- Trigonopilus Fairmaire, 1893 (Indomalaya)
- Trigonopoda Gebien, 1914 (Indomalaya)
- Trigonopus Mulsant & Rey, 1853 (tropical Africa)
- Trogloderus Leconte, 1879 (North America)
- Ulus Horn, 1870 (North America and the Neotropics)
- Upembarus Koch, 1956 (tropical Africa)
- Viettagona G.S. Medvedev & Merkl, 2003 (Indomalaya)
- Weisea Semenov, 1891 (the Palearctic)
- Wolladrus Iwan & Kaminski, 2016 (the Palearctic)
- Xerolinus Ivie & Hart, 2016 (the Neotropics)
- Zidalus Mulsant & Rey, 1853 (the Palearctic and tropical Africa)
- Zophodes Fåhraeus, 1870 (tropical Africa)
- Zoutpansbergia Koch, 1956 (tropical Africa)
- † Eupachypterus Kirejtshuk, Nabozhenko & Nel, 2010
- † Palaeosclerum Nabozhenko & Kirejtshuk, 2017
