= List of Opatrini genera =

These genera belong to Opatrini, a tribe of darkling beetles in the family Tenebrionidae.

== Opatrini genera ==
- Aconobius Casey, 1895 (North America)
- Adavius Mulsant & Rey, 1859 (the Palearctic and Indomalaya)
- Adoryacus Koch, 1963 (tropical Africa)
- Amathobius Gebien, 1920 (tropical Africa)
- Amblysphagus Fairmaire, 1896 (tropical Africa and Indomalaya)
- Ammidium Erichson, 1843 (tropical Africa)
- Ammobius Guérin-Méneville, 1844 (the Palearctic and Indomalaya)
- Ammodonus Mulsant & Rey, 1859 (North America and the Neotropics)
- Amphithrixoides Bouchard & Löbl, 2008 (the Palearctic)
- Anatrum Reichardt, 1936 (the Palearctic)
- Arabammobius Grimm & Lillig, 2020 (the Palearctic and tropical Africa)
- Asiocaedius G.S. Medvedev & Nepesova, 1985 (the Palearctic)
- Austrocaribius Marcuzzi, 1954 (the Neotropics)
- Blacodatus Koch, 1963 (tropical Africa)
- Blapstinus Dejean, 1821 (North America, the Neotropics, and Oceania)
- Blenosia Laporte, 1840 (tropical Africa)
- Brachyesthes Fairmaire, 1868 (the Palearctic and Indomalaya)
- Brachyidium Fairmaire, 1883 (Indomalaya, Australasia, and Oceania)
- Caediexis Lebedev, 1932 (the Palearctic)
- Caediomorpha Blackburn, 1888 (Australasia)
- Caedius Blanchard, 1845 (the Palearctic, tropical Africa, Indomalaya, and Australasia)
- Calaharena Koch, 1963 (tropical Africa)
- Cenophorus Mulsant & Rey, 1859 (the Neotropics)
- Clitobius Mulsant & Rey, 1859 (the Palearctic and tropical Africa)
- Coeloecetes Blair, 1929 (Indomalaya)
- Conibiosoma Casey, 1890 (North America)
- Conibius LeConte, 1851 (North America, the Neotropics, and Oceania)
- Corinta Koch, 1950 (tropical Africa)
- Cornopterus Koch, 1950 (tropical Africa)
- Crististibes Koch, 1963 (tropical Africa)
- Cybotus Casey, 1890 (the Neotropics)
- Cyptus Gerstaecker, 1871 (the Palearctic and tropical Africa)
- Diaderma Koch, 1960 (tropical Africa)
- Diastolinus Mulsant & Rey, 1859 (the Neotropics)
- Dilamus Jacquelin du Val, 1861 (the Palearctic and tropical Africa)
- Diphyrrhynchus Fairmaire, 1849 (the Palearctic, tropical Africa, Indomalaya, Australasia, and Oceania)
- Eichleria Kaminski, 2015 (tropical Africa)
- Emmalus Erichson, 1843 (tropical Africa)
- Ephalus LeConte, 1862 (North America and the Neotropics)
- Eremostibes Koch, 1963 (tropical Africa)
- Eumylada Reitter, 1904 (the Palearctic)
- Eurycaulus Fairmaire, 1868 (the Palearctic and tropical Africa)
- Falsammidium Koch, 1960 (tropical Africa)
- Falsocaedius Español, 1943 (the Palearctic)
- Falsolobodera Kaszab, 1967 (the Palearctic)
- Freyula Koch, 1959 (tropical Africa)
- Goajiria Ivie & Hart, 2016 (the Neotropics)
- Gonocephalum Solier, 1834 (North America, tropical Africa, Indomalaya, Australasia, and Oceania)
- Hadrodes Wollaston, 1877 (the Palearctic)
- Hadrophasis Ferrer, 1992 (tropical Africa)
- Helenomelas Ardoin, 1972 (the Palearctic)
- Helibatus Mulsant & Rey, 1859 (tropical Africa)
- Heterocheira Dejean, 1836 (tropical Africa and Australasia)
- Heterotarsus Latreille, 1829 (the Palearctic, tropical Africa, and Indomalaya)
- Hovarygmus Fairmaire, 1898 (tropical Africa)
- Hummelinckia Marcuzzi, 1954 (the Neotropics)
- Jintaium Ren, 1999 (the Palearctic)
- Luebbertia Koch, 1963 (tropical Africa)
- Mateuina Español, 1944 (the Palearctic)
- Melanesthes Dejean, 1834 (the Palearctic)
- Melanocoma Wollaston, 1868 (tropical Africa)
- Mesomorphus Miedel, 1880 (the Palearctic, tropical Africa, Indomalaya, Australasia, and Oceania)
- Messoricolum Koch, 1960 (tropical Africa)
- Microstizopus Koch, 1963 (tropical Africa)
- Moragacinella Español, 1954 (the Palearctic)
- Myladina Reitter, 1889 (the Palearctic)
- Namazopus Koch, 1963 (tropical Africa)
- Nemanes Fairmaire, 1888 (tropical Africa)
- Neopachypterus Bouchard, Löbl & Merkl, 2007 (the Palearctic and Indomalaya)
- Nesocaedius Kolbe, 1915 (the Palearctic and Indomalaya)
- Nevisia Marcuzzi, 1986 (the Neotropics)
- Nocibiotes Casey, 1895 (North America)
- Notibius LeConte, 1851 (North America)
- Opatroides Brullé, 1832 (North America, tropical Africa, Indomalaya, and Australasia)
- Opatrum Fabricius, 1775 (the Palearctic)
- Pachymastus Fairmaire, 1896 (tropical Africa)
- Parastizopus Gebien, 1938 (tropical Africa)
- Penthicinus Reitter, 1896 (the Palearctic)
- Penthicus Faldermann, 1836 (the Palearctic and tropical Africa)
- Periloma Gebien, 1938 (tropical Africa)
- Perithrix Fairmaire, 1879 (the Palearctic)
- Phelopatrum Marseul, 1876 (the Palearctic)
- Planostibes Gemminger, 1870 (tropical Africa)
- Platylus Mulsant & Rey, 1859 (the Neotropics)
- Platynosum Mulsant & Rey, 1859 (the Palearctic)
- Platyprocnemis Español & Lindberg, 1963 (tropical Africa)
- Plesioderes Mulsant & Rey, 1859 (tropical Africa and Indomalaya)
- Pocadiopsis Fairmaire, 1896 (Indomalaya)
- Polycoelogastridion Reichardt, 1936 (the Palearctic and Indomalaya)
- Prodilamus Ardoin, 1969 (the Palearctic and tropical Africa)
- Proscheimus Desbrochers des Loges, 1881 (the Palearctic)
- Psammestus Reichardt, 1936 (the Palearctic)
- Psammogaster Koch, 1953 (tropical Africa)
- Pseudolamus Fairmaire, 1874 (the Palearctic)
- Pseudoleichenum Ardoin, 1972 (tropical Africa)
- Raynalius Chatanay, 1912 (tropical Africa)
- Reichardtiellina Kaszab, 1982 (the Palearctic)
- Scleroides Fairmaire, 1883 (Australasia)
- Scleropatroides Löbl & Merkl, 2003 (the Palearctic, tropical Africa, and Indomalaya)
- Scleropatrum Reitter, 1887 (the Palearctic and Indomalaya)
- Sclerum Dejean, 1834 (the Palearctic, tropical Africa, and Indomalaya)
- Scymena Pascoe, 1866 (Australasia)
- Sinorus Mulsant & Revelière, 1861 (the Palearctic)
- Sobas Pascoe, 1863 (Australasia)
- Socotropatrum Koch, 1970 (tropical Africa)
- Sphaerostibes Koch, 1963 (tropical Africa)
- Stizopus Erichson, 1843 (tropical Africa)
- Sulpius Fairmaire, 1906 (tropical Africa)
- Syntyphlus Koch, 1953 (tropical Africa)
- Tarphiophasis Wollaston, 1877 (tropical Africa)
- Tidiguinia Español, 1959 (the Palearctic)
- Tonibiastes Casey, 1895 (North America)
- Tonibius Casey, 1895 (North America)
- Trichosternum Wollaston, 1861 (tropical Africa)
- Trichoton Hope, 1841 (North America and the Neotropics)
- Trigonopilus Fairmaire, 1893 (Indomalaya)
- Trigonopoda Gebien, 1914 (Indomalaya)
- Ulus Horn, 1870 (North America and the Neotropics)
- Weisea Semenov, 1891 (the Palearctic)
- Wolladrus Iwan & Kaminski, 2016 (the Palearctic)
- Xerolinus Ivie & Hart, 2016 (the Neotropics)
- † Eupachypterus Kirejtshuk, Nabozhenko & Nel, 2010
- † Palaeosclerum Nabozhenko & Kirejtshuk, 2017
