= Blapstinus histricus =

Scientific classification
- Kingdom: Animalia
- Phylum: Arthropoda
- Class: Insecta
- Order: Coleoptera
- Suborder: Polyphaga
- Infraorder: Cucujiformia
- Family: Tenebrionidae
- Tribe: Opatrini
- Genus: Blapstinus
- Species: B. histricus

Binomial name
- Blapstinus histricus Casey, 1891

Species of beetle

Blapstinus histricus is a species of darkling beetle in the family Tenebrionidae.
