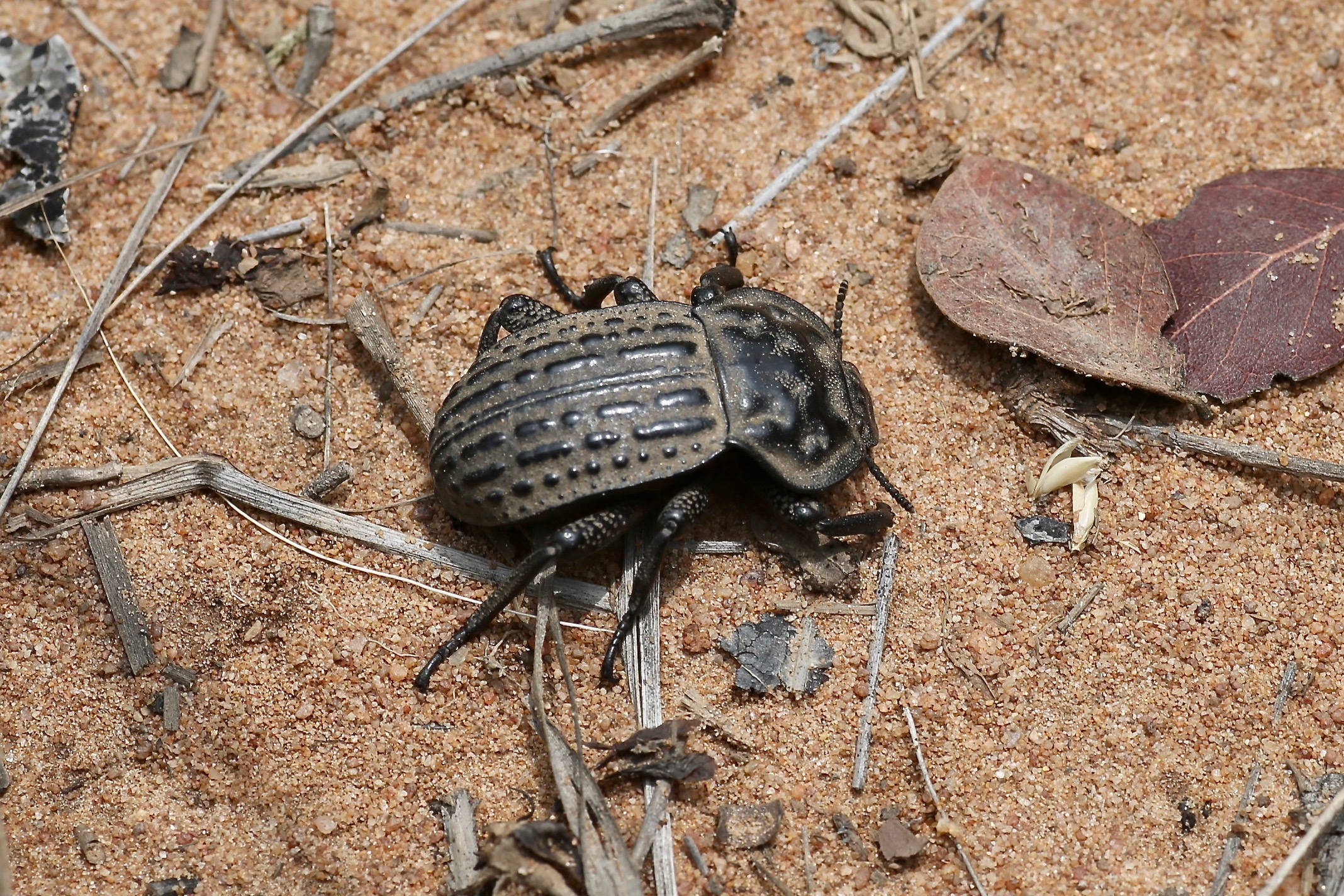
- Anomalipus expansicollis, South Africa

Scientific classification
- Kingdom: Animalia
- Phylum: Arthropoda
- Clade: Pancrustacea
- Class: Insecta
- Order: Coleoptera
- Suborder: Polyphaga
- Infraorder: Cucujiformia
- Family: Tenebrionidae
- Subfamily: Blaptinae
- Tribe: Platynotini; Mulsant & Rey, 1853

Subtribes
- Eurynotina Mulsant & Rey, 1854; Platynotina Mulsant & Rey, 1853

= Platynotini =

Tribe of beetles

Platynotini is a tribe of darkling beetles in the family Tenebrionidae. There are more than 70 genera in Platynotini. Representatives of this group are distributed across various biogeographic regions, including North and South America (Asiopus, Opatrinus), the southern Palaearctic (Zidalus), the Afrotropical region (e.g., Gonopus), and the Indomalayan realm (e.g., Platynotus).

Morphologically, members of Platynotini can be distinguished from other tribes within the subfamily Blaptinae by the presence of a stridulatory gula, which is used for sound production. Additionally, the monophyly of the tribe has been strongly supported by recent molecular phylogenetic studies.

== Genera ==
These genera belong to the tribe Platynotini:

- Adamus Iwan, 1997 (Indomalaya)
- Alaetrinus Iwan, 1995 (North America and the Neotropics)
- Amblychirus Koch, 1956 (tropical Africa)
- Anchophthalmops Koch, 1956 (North America and Indomalaya)
- Anchophthalmus Gerstaecker, 1854 (tropical Africa)
- Angolositus Koch, 1955 (tropical Africa)
- Anomalipus Guérin-Méneville, 1831 (tropical Africa)
- Atrocrates Koch, 1956 (tropical Africa)
- Atrocrypticanus Iwan, 1999 (tropical Africa)
- Bantodemus Koch, 1955 (tropical Africa)
- Byrrhoncus Koch, 1954 (tropical Africa)
- Capidium Koch, 1954 (tropical Africa)
- Clastopus Fairmaire, 1898 (tropical Africa)
- Claudegirardius Iwan, 1999 (tropical Africa)
- Colophonesthes Koch, 1954 (tropical Africa)
- Colpotinoides Kaszab, 1975 (tropical Africa)
- Crypticanus Fairmaire, 1897 (tropical Africa)
- Doyenus Iwan, 1996 (tropical Africa)
- Ectateus Koch, 1956 (tropical Africa)
- Eleoselinus Kamiński, 2014 (tropical Africa)
- Eucolus Mulsant & Rey, 1853 (Indomalaya)
- Eurynotus W. Kirby, 1819 (tropical Africa)
- Eviropodus Koch, 1956 (tropical Africa)
- Glyptopteryx Gebien, 1910 (tropical Africa)
- Gonopus Latreille, 1828 (tropical Africa)
- Heteropsectropus Kaszab, 1941 (tropical Africa)
- Hirtograbies Koch, 1954 (tropical Africa)
- Hovademus Iwan, 1996 (tropical Africa)
- Isoncophallus Koch, 1954 (tropical Africa)
- Lechius Iwan, 1995 (tropical Africa)
- Madobalus Fairmaire, 1901 (tropical Africa)
- Melanocratus Fairmaire, 1895 (tropical Africa)
- Melanopterus Mulsant & Rey, 1854 (tropical Africa)
- Menearchus Carter, 1920 (tropical Africa)
- Menederes Solier, 1848 (tropical Africa)
- Menederopsis Koch, 1954 (tropical Africa)
- Monodius Koch, 1956 (tropical Africa)
- Muelleropsectropus Lumen & Kamiński (South Africa)
- Nesopatrum Gebien, 1921 (tropical Africa)
- Notocorax Dejean, 1834 (Indomalaya)
- Ograbies Péringuey, 1899 (tropical Africa)
- Oncotus Blanchard, 1845 (tropical Africa)
- Opatrinus Dejean, 1821 (the Neotropics)
- Parabantodemus Iwan, 2000 (tropical Africa)
- Paraselinus Kamiński, 2013 (tropical Africa)
- Penthicoides Fairmaire, 1896 (Indomalaya)
- Phaleriderma Koch, 1954 (tropical Africa)
- Phallocentrion Koch, 1956 (tropical Africa)
- Phylacastus Fairmaire, 1897 (tropical Africa)
- Phymatoplata Koch, 1956 (tropical Africa)
- Platyburak Iwan, 1990 (Indomalaya)
- Platyburmanicus Iwan, 2003 (Indomalaya)
- Platycolpotus Iwan, 1997 (Indomalaya)
- Platynotoides Kaszab, 1975 (Indomalaya)
- Platynotus Fabricius, 1801 (Indomalaya)
- Pokryszkiella Iwan, 1996 (tropical Africa)
- Psectrapus Solier, 1848 (tropical Africa)
- Pseudoblaps Guérin-Méneville, 1834 (the Palearctic and Indomalaya)
- Pseudonotocorax Iwan, 1997 (Indomalaya)
- Pteroselinus Kaminski, 2015 (tropical Africa)
- Rugoplatynotus Kaszab, 1975 (Indomalaya)
- Schelodontes Koch, 1956 (tropical Africa)
- Schyzoschelus Koch, 1954 (tropical Africa)
- Sebastianus Iwan, 1996 (tropical Africa)
- Selinopodus Koch, 1956 (tropical Africa)
- Selinus Mulsant & Rey, 1853 (tropical Africa)
- Stenogonopus Gebien, 1938 (tropical Africa)
- Stridigula Koch, 1954 (tropical Africa)
- Styphacus Fairmaire, 1901 (tropical Africa)
- Trigonopus Mulsant & Rey, 1853 (tropical Africa)
- Upembarus Koch, 1956 (tropical Africa)
- Zidalus Mulsant & Rey, 1853 (the Palearctic and tropical Africa)
- Zophodes Fåhraeus, 1870 (tropical Africa)
