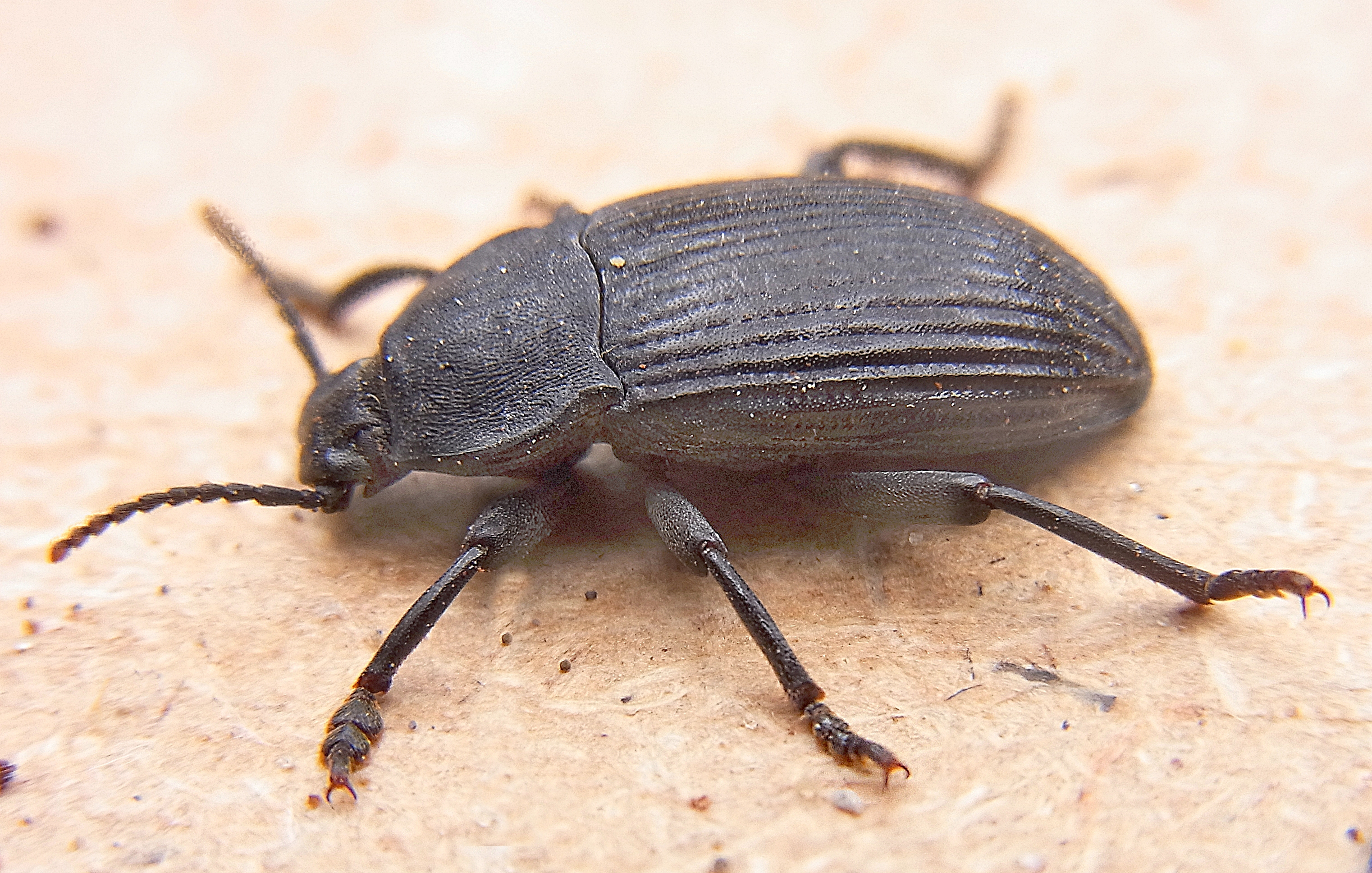
- Dendarus coarcticollis, France

Scientific classification
- Kingdom: Animalia
- Phylum: Arthropoda
- Class: Insecta
- Order: Coleoptera
- Suborder: Polyphaga
- Infraorder: Cucujiformia
- Family: Tenebrionidae
- Subfamily: Blaptinae
- Tribe: Dendarini; Mulsant & Rey, 1854

Subtribes
- Dendarina Mulsant & Rey, 1854; Melambiina Mulsant & Rey, 1854

= Dendarini =

Genus of Darkling Beetles

Dendarini is a tribe of darkling beetles in the family Tenebrionidae. There are more than 30 genera in Dendarini. The tribe is subdivided into Dendarina and Melambiina. Both those taxa display European-African amphitropical disjunction distribution.

In research by Kamiński et al. published in 2021, Dendarini and six other tribes were moved from Tenebrioninae into the newly resurrected subfamily Blaptinae. These tribes contained 281 genera and about 4000 species, about 50% of Tenebrioninae. The new classification was followed by Bouchard et al. the same year.

== Genera ==
These genera belong to the tribe Dendarini:

- Allophylax Bedel, 1906 (the Palearctic)
- Bermejoina Español, 1944 (the Palearctic)
- Bioplanes Mulsant, 1854 (the Palearctic)
- Dendarophylan Español, 1945 (the Palearctic)
- Dendarus Dejean, 1821 (the Palearctic)
- Gridelliopus Koch, 1956 (tropical Africa)
- Guildia Antoine, 1957 (the Palearctic)
- Hadroderus Koch, 1956 (tropical Africa)
- Haemodus Gebien, 1943 (tropical Africa)
- Hanstroemium Koch, 1953 (tropical Africa)
- Heliopates Dejean, 1834 (the Palearctic)
- Hoplarion Mulsant & Rey, 1854 (the Palearctic)
- Lasioderus Mulsant & Rey, 1854 (tropical Africa)
- Litoboriolus Español, 1945 (the Palearctic)
- Litoborus Mulsant & Rey, 1854 (the Palearctic)
- Litororus Reitter, 1904 (the Palearctic)
- Meglyphus Motschulsky, 1872 (tropical Africa)
- Melambius Mulsant & Rey, 1854 (the Palearctic)
- Melansis Wollaston, 1864 (the Palearctic)
- Melasmana Strand, 1935 (the Palearctic)
- Microphylacinus Iwan, Kaminski & Aalbu, 2011 (tropical Africa)
- Micrositus Mulsant & Rey, 1854 (the Palearctic)
- Minorus Mulsant & Rey, 1854 (tropical Africa)
- Neoisocerus Bouchard, Lawrence, Davies & Newton, 2005 (the Palearctic)
- Orarabion Leo & Liberto, 2011 (tropical Africa)
- Oreomelasma Español, 1975 (the Palearctic)
- Otinia Antoine, 1942 (the Palearctic)
- Peyerimhoffius Koch, 1948 (the Palearctic)
- Phylacinus Fairmaire, 1896 (tropical Africa)
- Phylan Sturm, 1826 (the Palearctic)
- Phylanmania Ferrer, 2013 (the Palearctic)
- Psammoardoinellus Leo, 1981 (the Palearctic)
- Pseudemmallus Koch, 1956 (tropical Africa)
- Pythiopus Koch, 1953 (tropical Africa)
- Selenepistoma Dejean, 1834 (tropical Africa)
- Silvestriellum Koch, 1956 (tropical Africa)
- Tragardhus Koch, 1956 (tropical Africa)
- Zoutpansbergia Koch, 1956 (tropical Africa)
