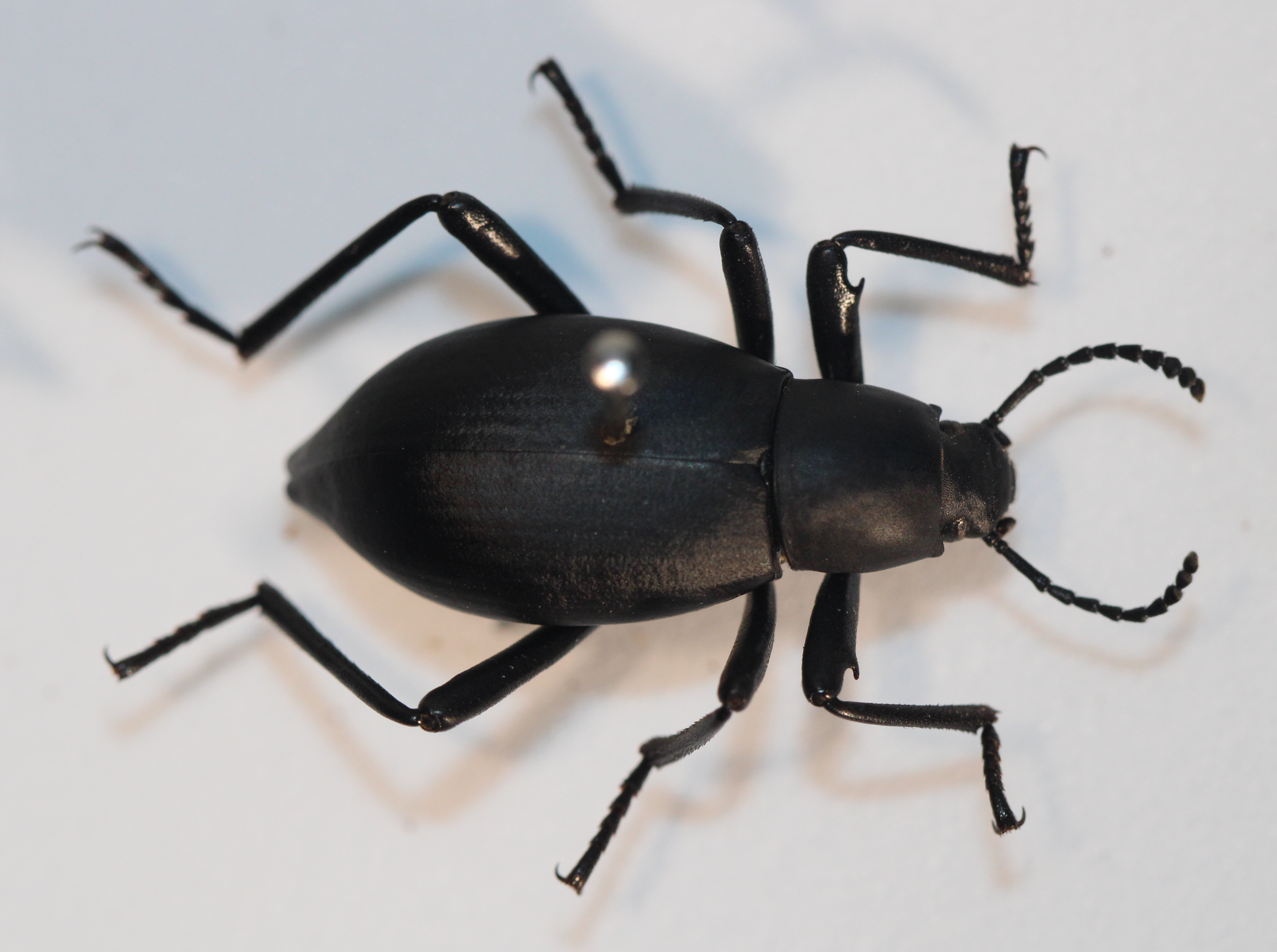
- Eleodes subnitens

Scientific classification
- Kingdom: Animalia
- Phylum: Arthropoda
- Class: Insecta
- Order: Coleoptera
- Suborder: Polyphaga
- Infraorder: Cucujiformia
- Family: Tenebrionidae
- Subfamily: Blaptinae
- Tribe: Amphidorini; LeConte, 1862

= Amphidorini =

Tribe of darkling beetles

Amphidorini is a tribe of darkling beetles in the family Tenebrionidae. There are six genera in Amphidorini.

In research by Kamiński et al. published in 2021, Amphidorini and six other tribes were moved from Tenebrioninae into the newly resurrected subfamily Blaptinae. These tribes contained 281 genera and about 4000 species, about 50% of Tenebrioninae. The new classification was followed by Bouchard et al. the same year.

In 2022, Johnston et al. removed the South American genus Nycterinus from Amiphidorini, it is now placed in incertae sedis within Tenebrinoninae.

== Genera ==
These genera belong to the tribe Amphidorini:

- Eleodes Eschscholtz, 1829 (desert stink beetles) (North America and the Neotropics)
- Eleodimorpha Blaisdell, 1909 (North America)
- Embaphion Say, 1824 (North America)
- Lariversius Blaisdell, 1947 (North America)
- Neobaphion Blaisdell, 1925 (North America)
- Trogloderus Leconte, 1879 (North America)
