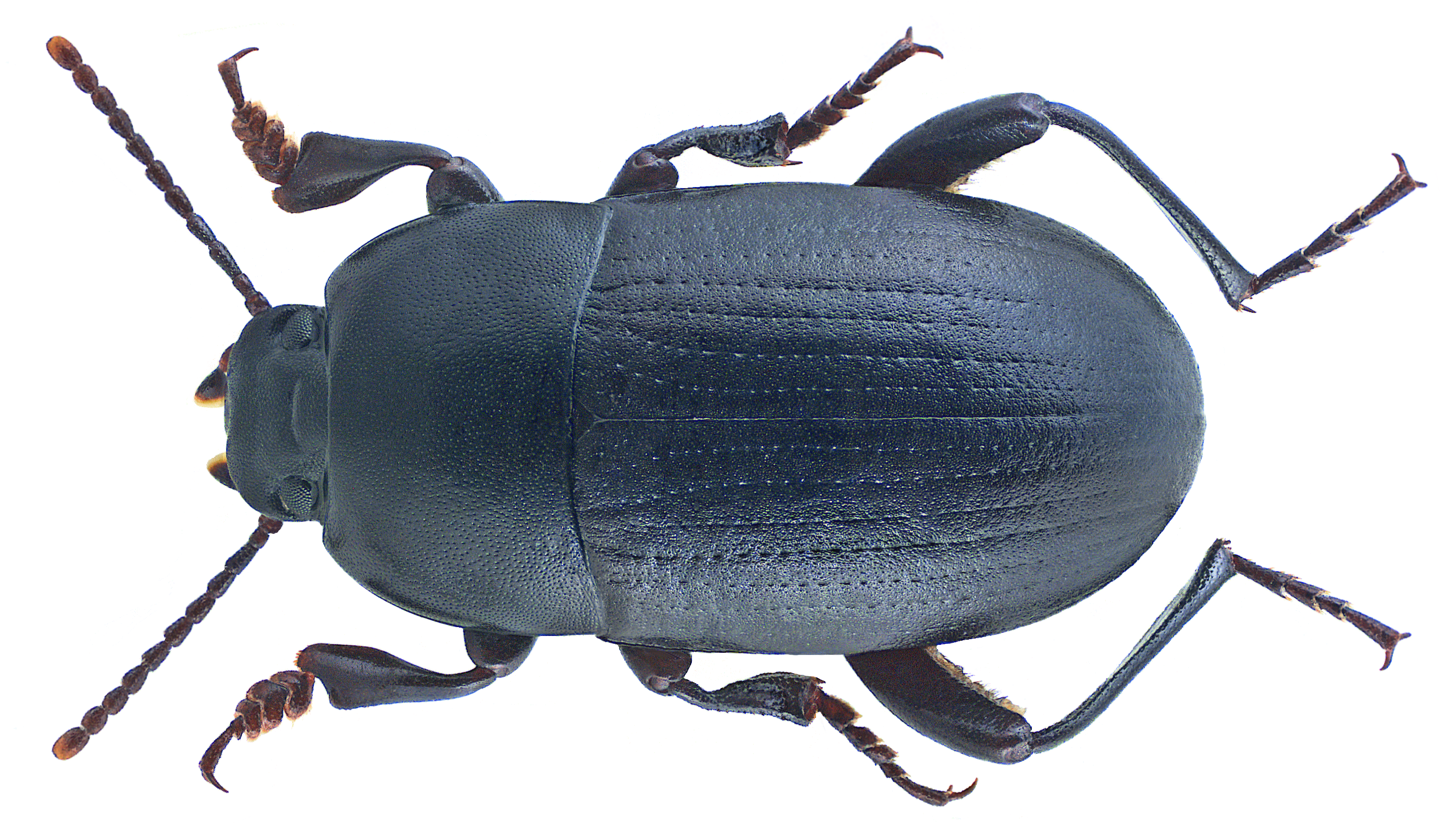
- Pedinus femoralis

Scientific classification
- Kingdom: Animalia
- Phylum: Arthropoda
- Class: Insecta
- Order: Coleoptera
- Suborder: Polyphaga
- Infraorder: Cucujiformia
- Family: Tenebrionidae
- Subfamily: Blaptinae
- Tribe: Pedinini; Eschscholtz, 1829

Subtribes
- Helopinina Lacordaire, 1859; Leichenina Mulsant, 1854; Pedinina Eschscholtz, 1829

= Pedinini =

Tribe of beetles

Pedinini is a tribe of darkling beetles in the family Tenebrionidae. There are 19 known genera in Pedinini.

In research by Kamiński et al. published in 2021, the concept Pedinini has been revisited. Based on molecular evidence Helopinina, Leichenina and Pedinina were considered subtribes within a single tribe. Identification key to Pedinina has been provided by Kamiński and Iwan in 2017, while the catalog of species representing Helopinina was published by Kamiński et al. 2021.

== Genera ==
These genera belong to the tribe Pedinini:

- Amatodes Dejean, 1834 (tropical Africa)
- Ametrocera Fåhraeus, 1870 (tropical Africa)
- Anaxius Fåhraeus, 1870 (tropical Africa)
- Apsheronellus Bogatchev, 1967 (the Palearctic)
- Aptila Fåhraeus, 1870 (tropical Africa)
- Asidodema Koch, 1958 (tropical Africa)
- Blastarnodes Koch, 1958 (tropical Africa)
- Cabirutus Strand, 1929 (the Palearctic and Indomalaya)
- Colpotinus Fairmaire, 1891 (the Palearctic)
- Diestecopus Solier, 1848 (tropical Africa)
- Drosochrus Erichson, 1843 (the Palearctic and tropical Africa)
- Leichenum Dejean, 1834 (North America, the Palearctic, Indomalaya, Australasia, and Oceania)
- Loensus R. Lucas, 1920 (tropical Africa and Indomalaya)
- Micrantereus Solier, 1848 (the Palearctic and tropical Africa)
- Nicandra Fairmaire, 1888 (tropical Africa)
- Oncopteryx Gebien, 1943 (tropical Africa)
- Pedinus Latreille, 1797 (the Palearctic and Indomalaya)
- Piscicula Robiche, 2004 (tropical Africa)
- Psectes Hesse, 1935 (tropical Africa)
