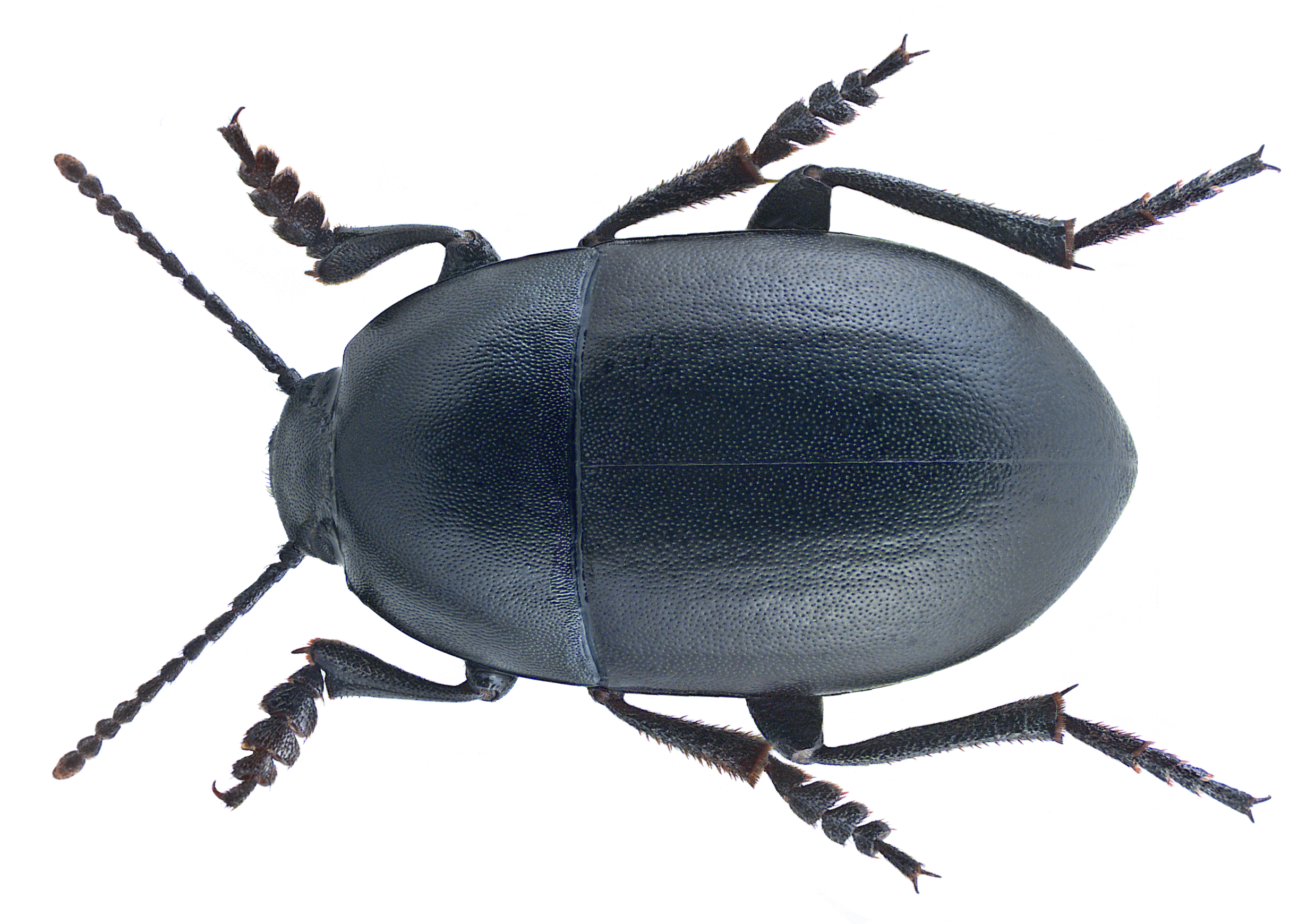
- Oodescelis polita, Russia

Scientific classification
- Kingdom: Animalia
- Phylum: Arthropoda
- Class: Insecta
- Order: Coleoptera
- Suborder: Polyphaga
- Infraorder: Cucujiformia
- Family: Tenebrionidae
- Subfamily: Blaptinae
- Tribe: Platyscelidini; Lacordaire, 1859

= Platyscelidini =

Tribe of beetles

Platyscelidini is a tribe of darkling beetles in the family Tenebrionidae. There are about eight genera in Platyscelidini.

In research by Kamiński et al. published in 2021, Platyscelidini and six other tribes were moved from Tenebrioninae into the newly resurrected subfamily Blaptinae. These tribes contained 281 genera and about 4000 species, about 50% of Tenebrioninae. The new classification was followed by Bouchard et al. the same year.

== Genera ==
These genera belong to the tribe Platyscelidini:

- Bioramix Bates, 1879 (the Palearctic)
- Microplatyscelis Kaszab, 1940 (the Palearctic)
- Myatis Bates, 1879 (the Palearctic)
- Oodescelis Motschulsky, 1845 (the Palearctic)
- Platyscelis Latreille, 1818 (the Palearctic)
- Somocoelia Heyden & Kraatz, 1882 (the Palearctic)
- Somocoeloplatys Skopin, 1968 (the Palearctic)
- Trichomyatis Schuster, 1931 (the Palearctic)
