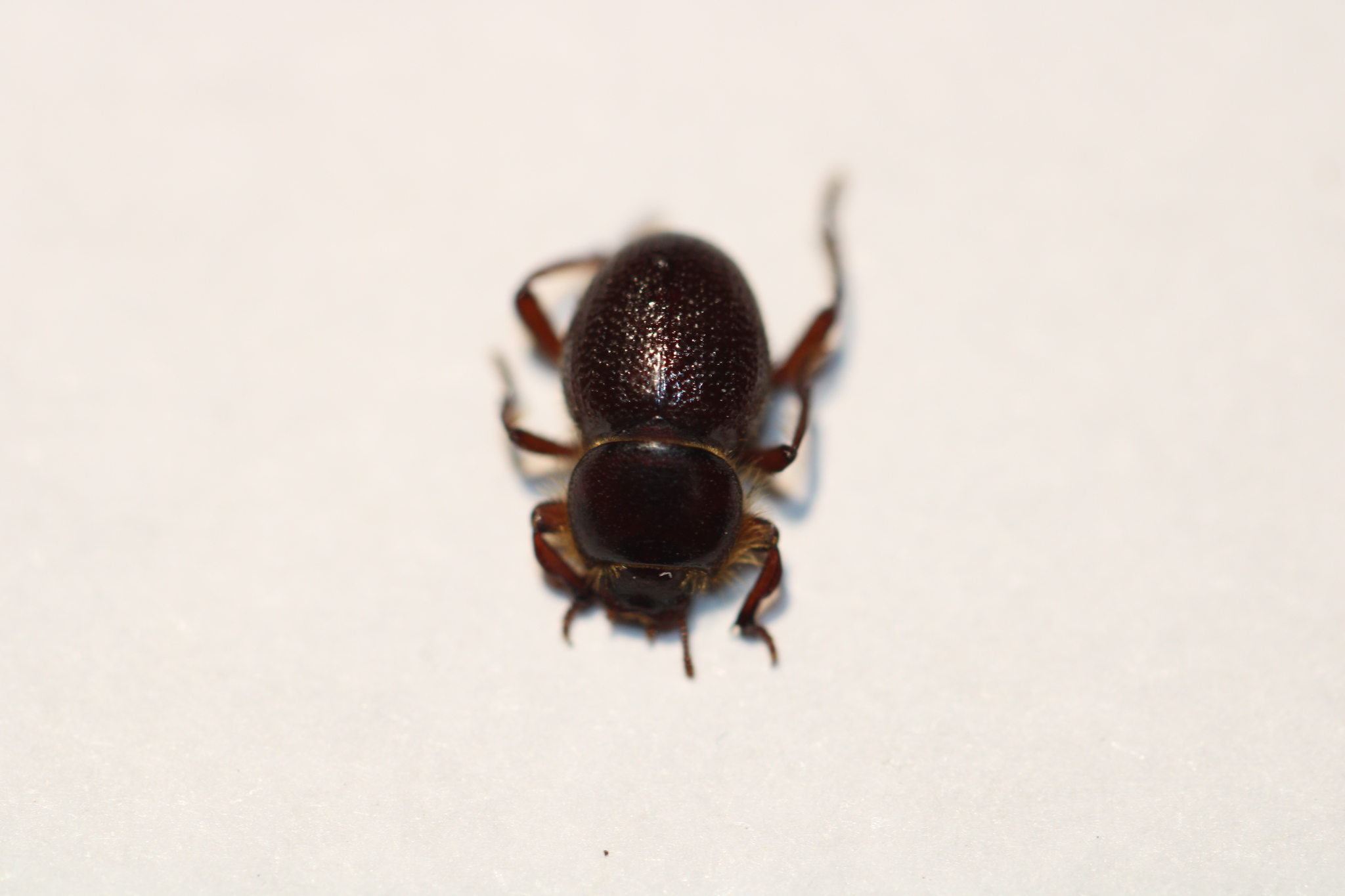
- Undescribed Lariversius species

Scientific classification
- Domain: Eukaryota
- Kingdom: Animalia
- Phylum: Arthropoda
- Class: Insecta
- Order: Coleoptera
- Suborder: Polyphaga
- Infraorder: Cucujiformia
- Family: Tenebrionidae
- Subfamily: Blaptinae
- Tribe: Amphidorini
- Genus: Lariversius; Blaisdell, 1947

Type species
- Lariversius tibialis Blaisdell, 1947

= Lariversius =

Genus of beetles

Lariversius is a monotypic genus of beetles in the family Tenebrionidae.

== Taxonomy ==
Lariversius contains the following species:

- Lariversius tibialis Blaisdell, 1947
