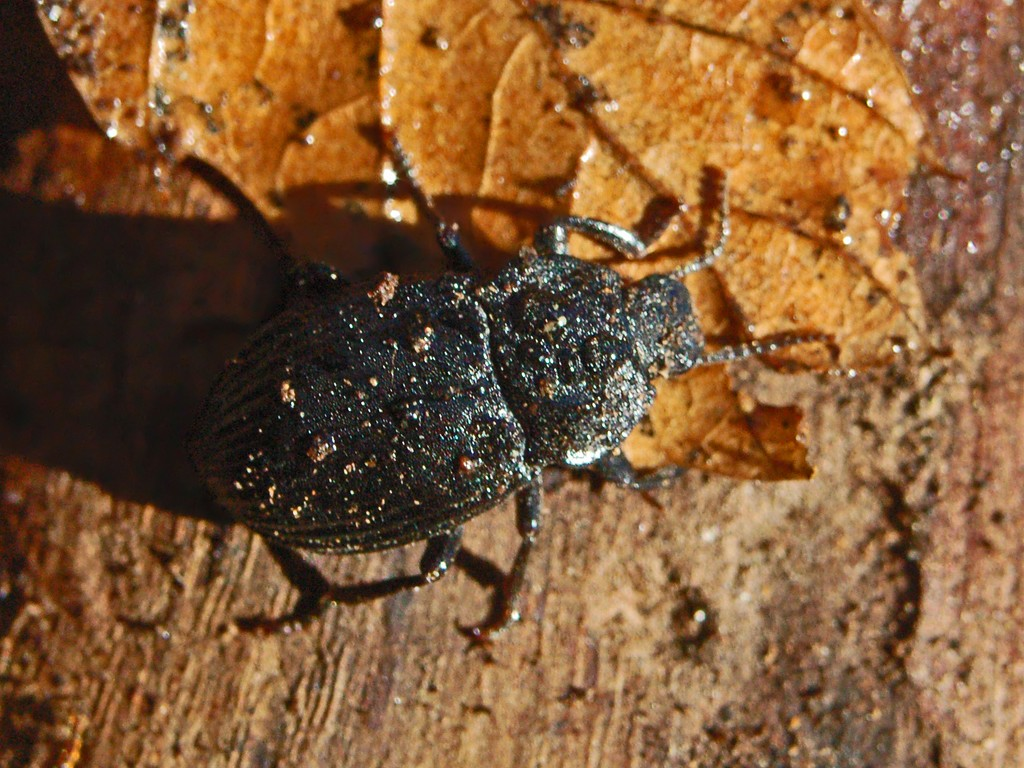
- Dendarus coarcticollis - Female

Scientific classification
- Domain: Eukaryota
- Kingdom: Animalia
- Phylum: Arthropoda
- Class: Insecta
- Order: Coleoptera
- Suborder: Polyphaga
- Infraorder: Cucujiformia
- Family: Tenebrionidae
- Genus: Dendarus
- Species: D. coarcticollis

Binomial name
- Dendarus coarcticollis (Mulsant, 1854)

Synonyms
- Dendarus tristis Laporte 1840; Pandarus coarcticollis Mulsant, 1854

= Dendarus coarcticollis =

Species of beetle

Dendarus coarcticollis is a species of darkling beetles belonging to the family Tenebrionidae subfamily Tenebrioninae.

These beetles are mainly present in France and Italy.

The adults grow up to 12–13 millimetres (0.47–0.51 in) long. The front legs in males are larger than in females, sexual dimorphism that allows males of these terrestrial and often dirty and slippery beetles to better hold on to the back of females. They are nocturnal. They usually overwinter under the bark of an old tree.
