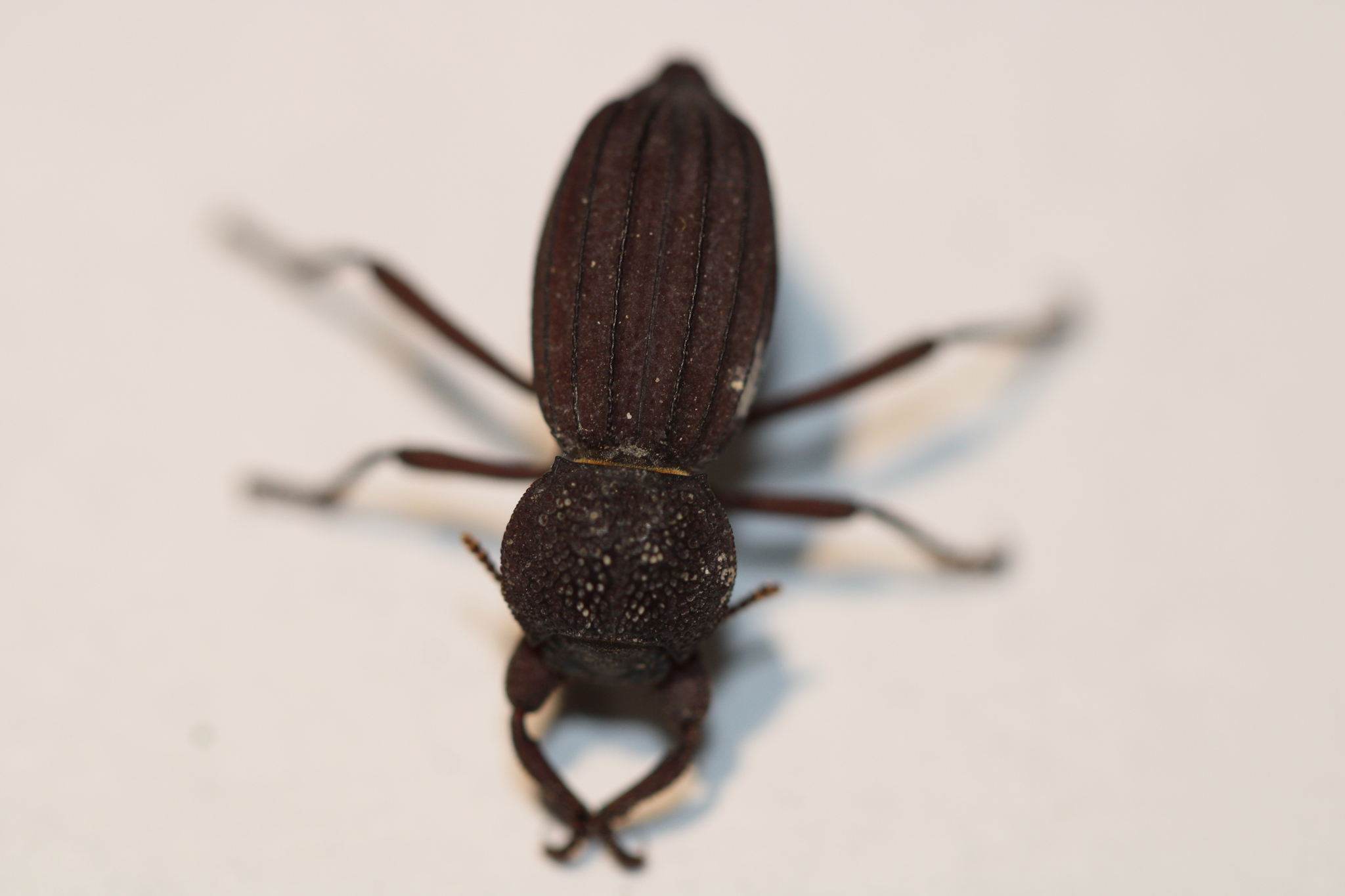

Scientific classification
- Kingdom: Animalia
- Phylum: Arthropoda
- Class: Insecta
- Order: Coleoptera
- Suborder: Polyphaga
- Infraorder: Cucujiformia
- Family: Tenebrionidae
- Genus: Trogloderus
- Species: T. major

Binomial name
- Trogloderus major Johnston, 2019

= Trogloderus major =

Species of beetle

Trogloderus major is a species of beetle in the family Tenebrionidae.
