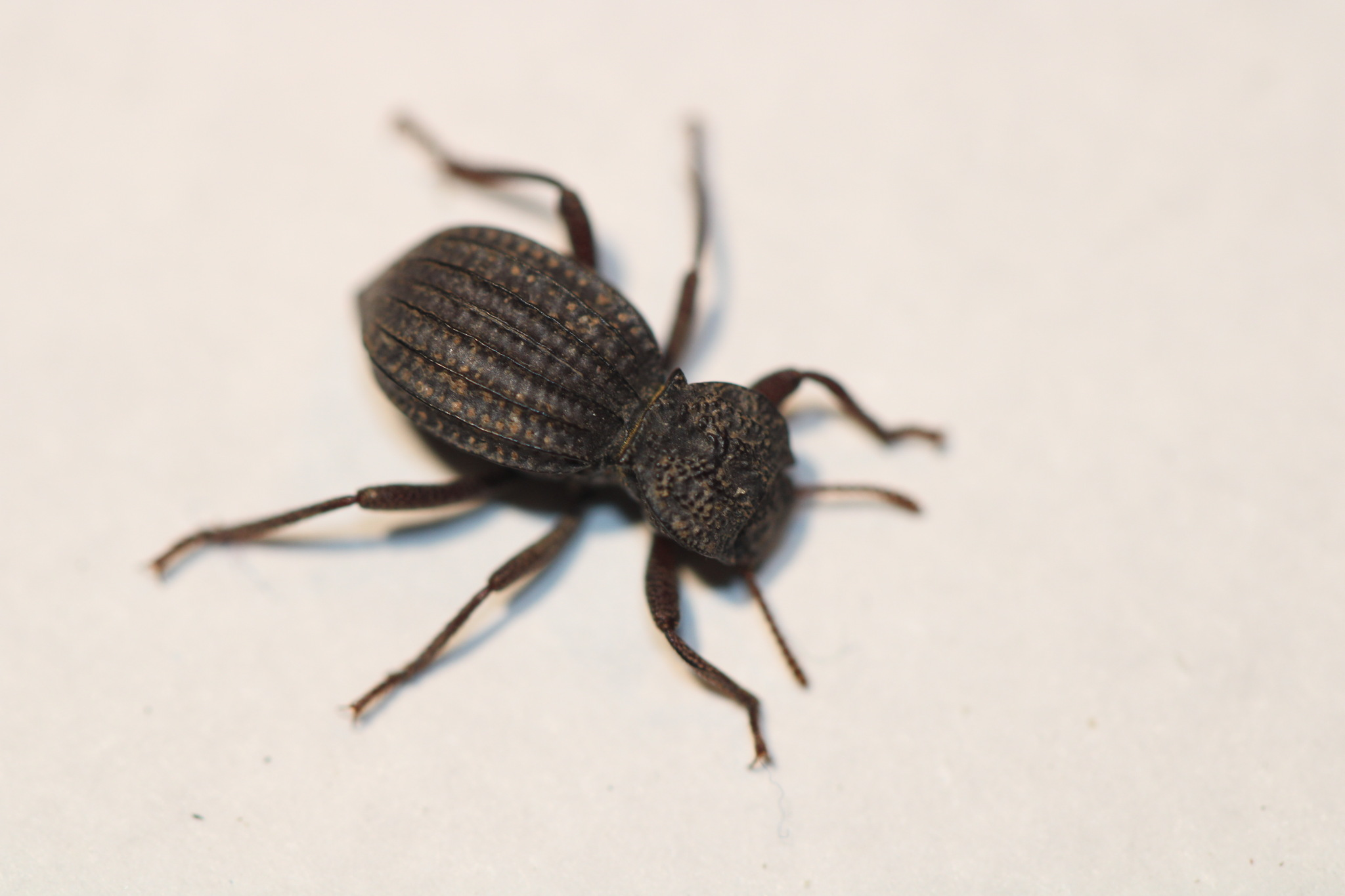

Scientific classification
- Kingdom: Animalia
- Phylum: Arthropoda
- Class: Insecta
- Order: Coleoptera
- Suborder: Polyphaga
- Infraorder: Cucujiformia
- Family: Tenebrionidae
- Genus: Trogloderus
- Species: T. warneri

Binomial name
- Trogloderus warneri Johnston, 2019

= Trogloderus warneri =

Species of beetle

Trogloderus warneri is a species of beetle in the family Tenebrionidae.
