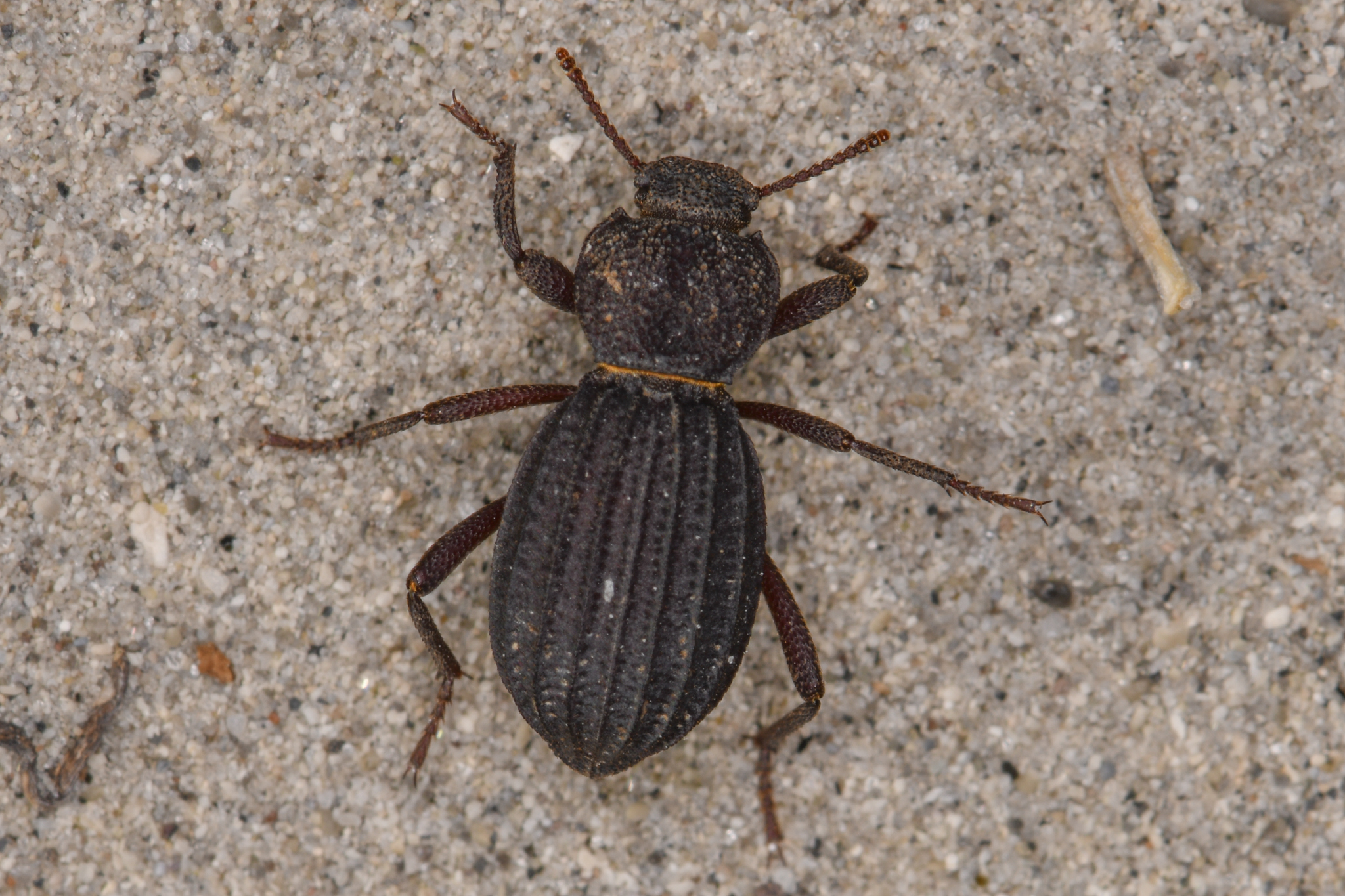
- Trogloderus arcanus

Scientific classification
- Kingdom: Animalia
- Phylum: Arthropoda
- Class: Insecta
- Order: Coleoptera
- Suborder: Polyphaga
- Infraorder: Cucujiformia
- Family: Tenebrionidae
- Subfamily: Blaptinae
- Tribe: Amphidorini
- Genus: Trogloderus; LeConte, 1879

Type species
- Trogloderus costatus LeConte, 1879

= Trogloderus =

Genus of beetles

Trogloderus is a genus of beetles in the family Tenebrionidae.

== Taxonomy ==
Trogloderus contains the following species:

- Trogloderus tuberculatus Blaisdell, 1909
- Trogloderus arcanus Johnston, 2019
- Trogloderus kandai Johnston, 2019
- Trogloderus vandykei La Rivers, 1946
- Trogloderus verpus Johnston, 2019
- Trogloderus major Johnston, 2019
- Trogloderus skillmani Johnston, 2019
- Trogloderus warneri Johnston, 2019
- Trogloderus nevadus La Rivers, 1943
- Trogloderus costatus LeConte, 1879
