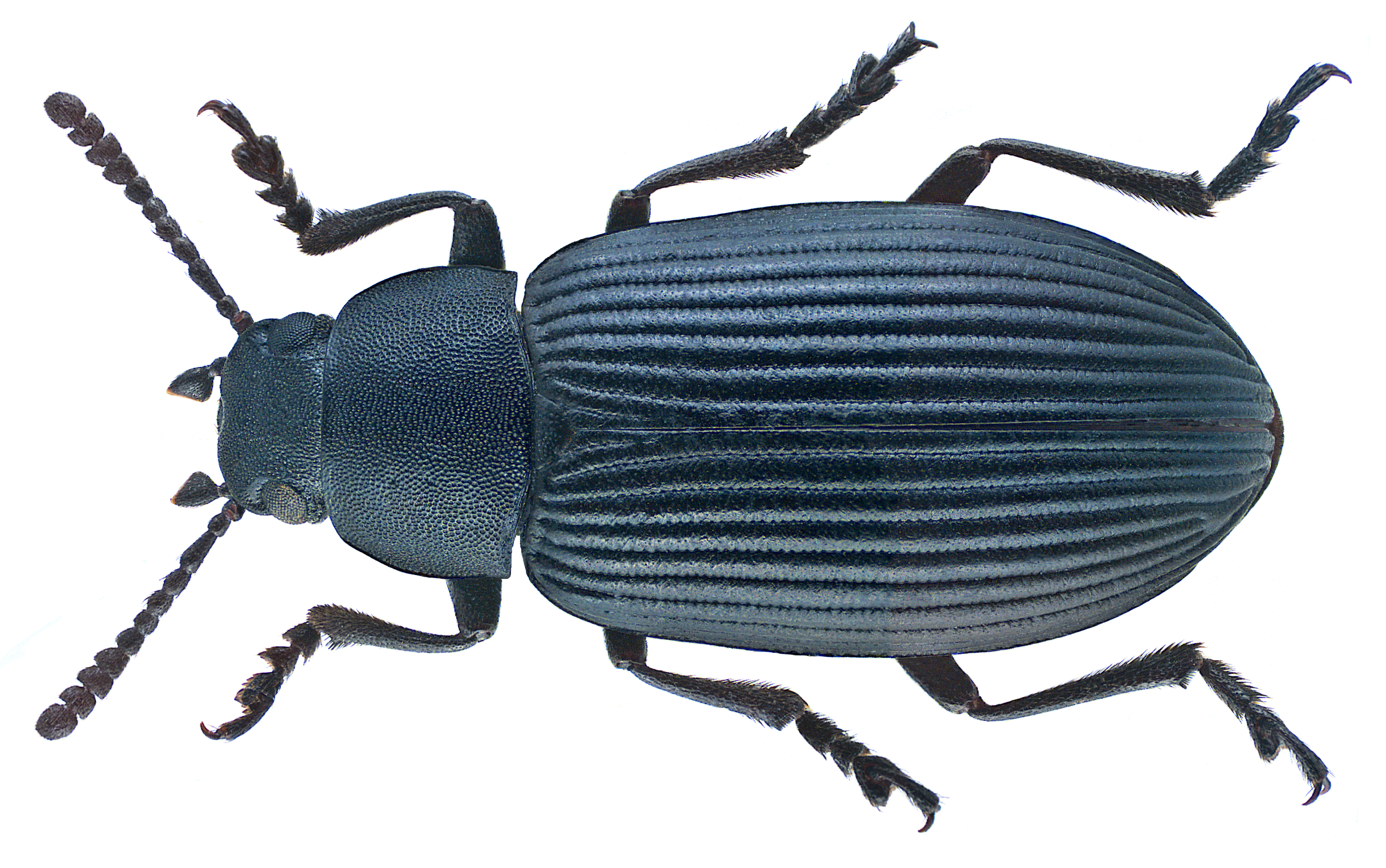
- Heterotarsus tenebrioides

Scientific classification
- Kingdom: Animalia
- Phylum: Arthropoda
- Class: Insecta
- Order: Coleoptera
- Suborder: Polyphaga
- Infraorder: Cucujiformia
- Family: Tenebrionidae
- Subfamily: Blaptinae
- Genus: Heterotarsus; Latreille, 1829

= Heterotarsus =

Genus of beetles

Heterotarsus is a genus of darkling beetles in the subfamily Blaptinae, occurring in Asia and Africa.

== Description ==
Heterotarsus have the clypeus deeply lobed in the middle. The antennae have a 4- or 5-segmented club. Each elytron has 9 striae and 10 intervals. The epipleurae of the elytra are broad, sharply margined and shortened well before the apex. The front and mid tarsi have the first three segments expanded and ventrally hairy, while the hind tarsi have the first two segments expanded and hairy. For all tarsi, the third-last segment is deeply lobed.

== Species ==
Some of the species in this genus are:

- Heterotarsus aphodioides Fairmaire, 1886
- Heterotarsus auriculatus Marséul, 1876
- Heterotarsus carinula Marséul, 1876
- Heterotarsus crenulifer Kaszab, 1941
- Heterotarsus indicus Marseul, 1876
- Heterotarsus inflatus Lacordaire, 1859
- Heterotarsus metallifer Kaszab, 1976
- Heterotarsus pustulifer Fairmaire, 1888
- Heterotarsus thailandicus Grimm, 2016
- Heterotarsus topali Kaszab, 1976
- Heterotarsus urbani Kaszab, 1941
