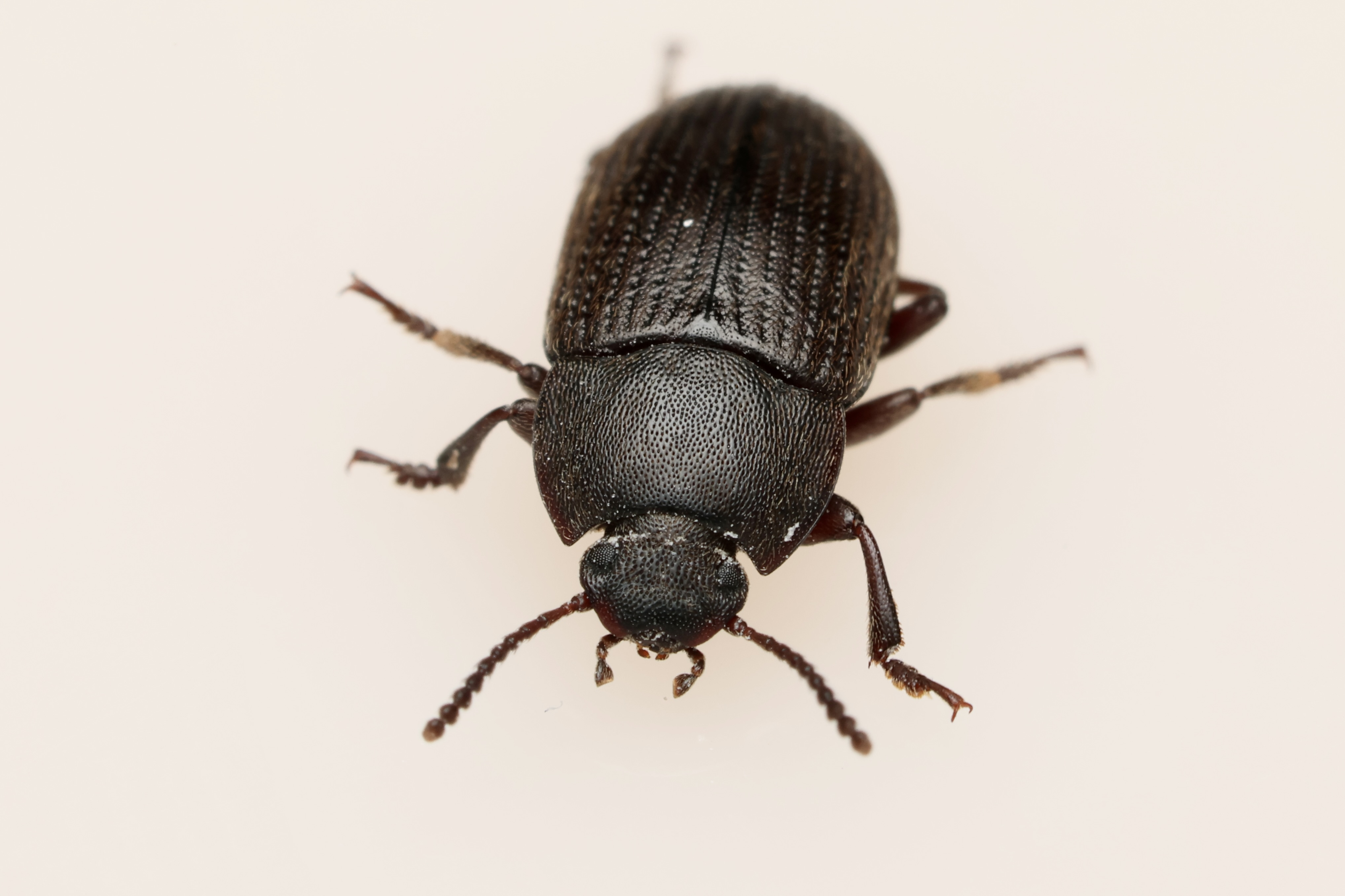

Scientific classification
- Kingdom: Animalia
- Phylum: Arthropoda
- Clade: Pancrustacea
- Class: Insecta
- Order: Coleoptera
- Suborder: Polyphaga
- Infraorder: Cucujiformia
- Family: Tenebrionidae
- Subfamily: Blaptinae
- Tribe: Opatrini
- Genus: Blapstinus; Dejean, 1821

Diversity
- at least 110 species

= Blapstinus =

Genus of beetles

Blapstinus is a genus of darkling beetles in the family Tenebrionidae. There are more than 100 described species in Blapstinus.

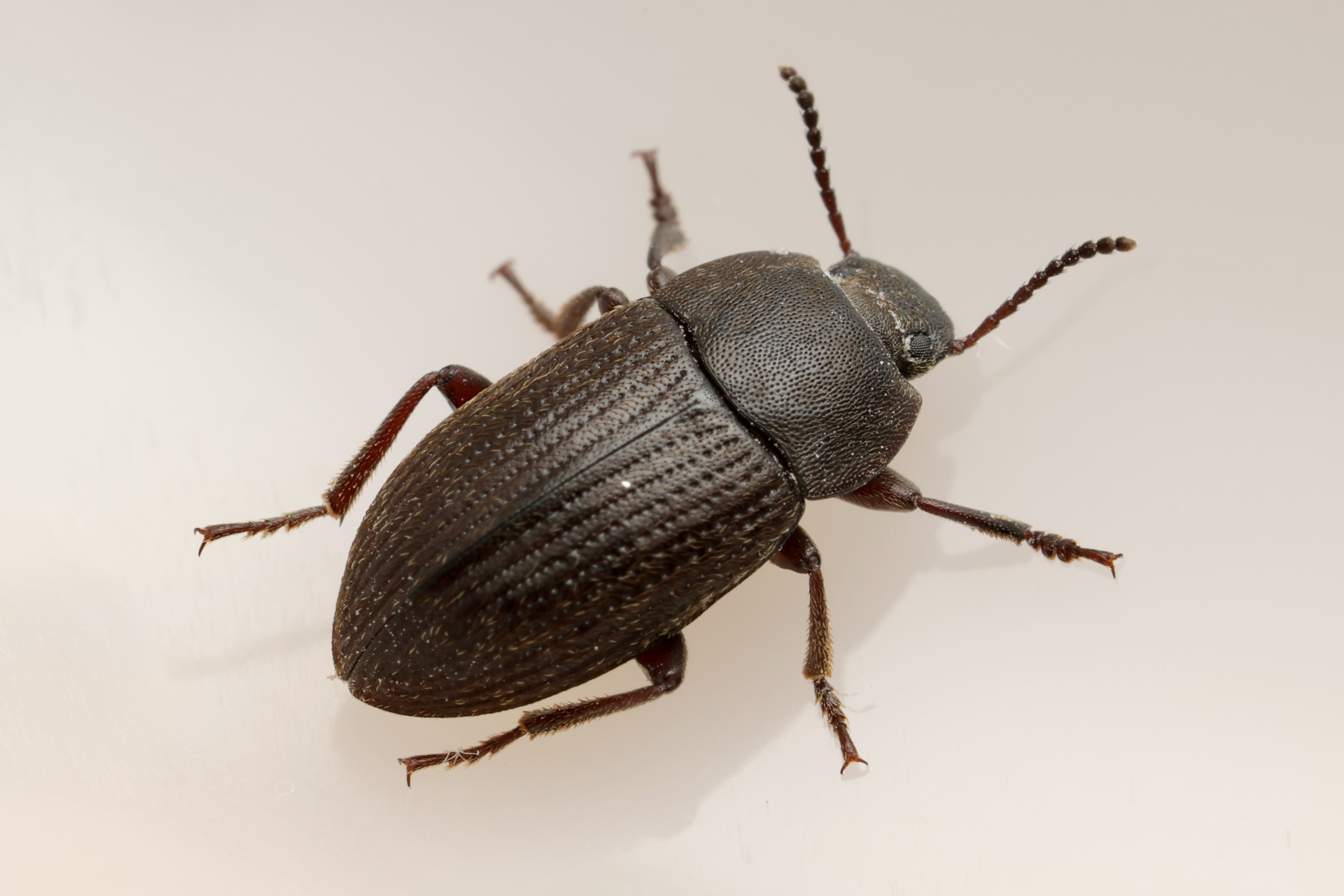
Blapstinus fortis dorsolateral posterior view
