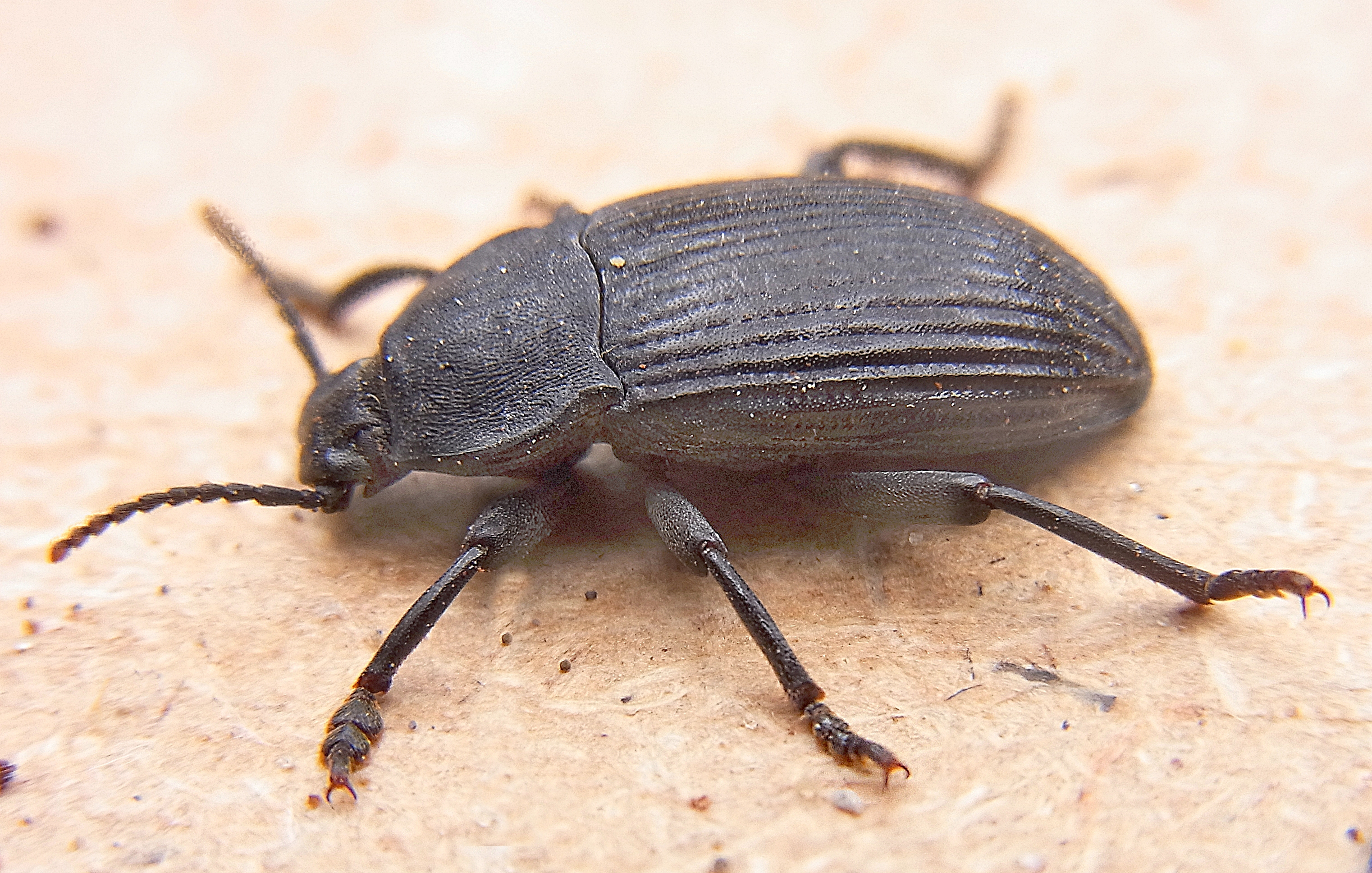
- Dendarus coarcticollis, France

Scientific classification
- Kingdom: Animalia
- Phylum: Arthropoda
- Class: Insecta
- Order: Coleoptera
- Suborder: Polyphaga
- Infraorder: Cucujiformia
- Family: Tenebrionidae
- Tribe: Dendarini
- Genus: Dendarus; Latreille, 1829

= Dendarus =

Genus of beetles

Dendarus is a genus of darkling beetles in the family Tenebrionidae. The genus is distributed from Morocco to Caucasus and exhibits a high level of diversity with 36 species, 27 of which are island endemics. Analyses of the phylogenetic relationships of 23 species from Greece and Turkey revealed 13 distinct lineages with several para- and polyphyletic cases corresponding to three major phylogroups [south/south-east Aegean (D. foraminosus complex, D. rhodius, D. sporadicus, D. wettsteini); central to north Aegean, Turkey and mainland Greece (D. crenulatus, D. moesiacus group, D. sinuatus complex, D. stygius) and mainland Greece (D. messenius, D. paganettii)].

== Species ==
The following species and subspecies within Dendarus are accepted by the Fauna Europaea database:

- Dendarus ananensis Chatzimanolis, Engel & Trichas, 2002
- Dendarus anaphianus Koch, 1948
- Dendarus angulitibia Koch, 1948
- Dendarus antikythirensis Chatzimanolis, Engel & Trichas, 2002
- Dendarus armeniacus Baudi, 1876
- Dendarus aubei (Mulsant & Rey, 1854)
- Dendarus caelatus Brullé, 1832
- Dendarus calcaratus Baudi, 1881
- Dendarus carinatus (Mulsant & Rey, 1854)
- Dendarus cazorlensis Koch, 1944
- Dendarus coarcticollis (Mulsant, 1854)
- Dendarus corcyrensis Koch, 1948
- Dendarus crenulatus (Ménétriés, 1832)
- Dendarus dalmatinus (Germar, 1824)
- Dendarus dentitibia Koch, 1948
- Dendarus depressus Reitter, 1915
- Dendarus dragonadanus Koch, 1948
- Dendarus elongatus (Mulsant & Rey, 1854)
- Dendarus falassarnensis Chatzimanolis, Engel & Trichas, 2002
- Dendarus foraminosus (Kuster, 1851)
- Dendarus graecus Brullé, 1832
- Dendarus grampusanus Koch, 1948
- Dendarus insidiosus (Mulsant & Rey, 1854)
  - D. insidiosus subsp. alcojonensis Español, 1961
  - D. insidiosus subsp. insidiosus (Mulsant & Rey, 1854)
- Dendarus lugens (Mulsant & Rey, 1854)
- Dendarus maximus Koch, 1948
- Dendarus messenius (Brullé, 1832)
- Dendarus moesiacus (Mulsant & Rey, 1854)
- Dendarus mylonasi Chatzimanolis, Engel & Trichas, 2002
- Dendarus opacus Koch, 1948
- Dendarus orientalis Seidlitz, 1893
- Dendarus pardoi Escalera, 1944
- Dendarus pectoralis (Mulsant & Rey, 1854)
  - D. pectoralis subsp. bejarensis Español, 1961
  - D. pectoralis subsp. castilianus (Piochard de la Brulerie, 1869)
  - D. pectoralis subsp. pectoralis (Mulsant & Rey, 1854)
- Dendarus piceus (Olivier, 1811)
- Dendarus piochardi Español, 1937
- Dendarus plicatulus (Brullé, 1832)
  - D. plicatulus subsp. jonicus Koch, 1948
  - D. plicatulus subsp. paganettii Koch, 1948
  - D. plicatulus subsp. plicatulus (Brullé, 1832)
  - D. plicatulus subsp. victoris (Mulsant & Rey, 1854)
- Dendarus politus Reitter, 1904
- Dendarus punctatus (Serville, 1825)
- Dendarus puncticollis Koch, 1948
- Dendarus rhodius Baudi, 1876
- Dendarus schatzmayri Koch, 1948
- Dendarus schusteri Español, 1937
- Dendarus scoparipes Reitter, 1904
- Dendarus seidlitzi Reitter, 1904
- Dendarus serripes Reitter, 1904
- Dendarus simius (Mulsant & Rey, 1854)
- Dendarus sinuatus (Mulsant & Rey, 1854)
- Dendarus sporadicus Koch, 1948
- Dendarus stampalicus Koch, 1948
- Dendarus stygius (Waltl, 1838)
  - D. stygius subsp. oertzeni Koch, 1948
  - D. stygius subsp. stygius (Waltl, 1838)
- Dendarus tenellus (Mulsant & Rey, 1854)
- Dendarus tristis Laporte de Castelnau, 1840 (Note: Some sources consider this a synonym of D. coarcticollis)
- Dendarus werneri Koch, 1948
- Dendarus wernerianus Koch, 1948
- Dendarus wettsteini Koch, 1948
- Dendarus zariquieyi Español, 1937
  - D. zariquieyi subsp. almeriensis Escalera, 1944
  - D. zariquieyi subsp. vivesi Español, 1961
  - D. zariquieyi subsp. zariquieyi Español, 1937
