= Xerolinus =

Scientific classification
- Kingdom: Animalia
- Phylum: Arthropoda
- Class: Insecta
- Order: Coleoptera
- Suborder: Polyphaga
- Infraorder: Cucujiformia
- Family: Tenebrionidae
- Subtribe: Opatrina
- Genus: Xerolinus; Ivie & Hart, 2016

Type species
- Diastolinus sallei Mulsant & Rey, 1859

Genus of beetles

Xerolinus is a genus of darkling beetle. It consists of approximately thirty species found in the West Indies. Michael A. Ivie and Charles J. Hart named and circumscribed the genus in 2016.

== Taxonomic history ==
The genus Xerolinus was circumscribed in 2016 by Montana State University coleopterists Michael A. Ivie and Charles J. Hart. They initially included twenty-nine species, which were mostly transferred from the genus Diastolinus. In a separate 2016 paper, Hart and Ivie described two new Xerolinus species. Ivie and Hart designated X. sallei, which French etymologists Étienne Mulsant and Claudius Rey initially described as Diastolinus sallei in 1859, to be the type species of Xerolinus. The generic name Xerolinus has a masculine gender. Its etymology comes from the Greek ξηρός (xērós; "dry, arid") combined with the ending of the generic name Diasolinus. This reflects the habitat these beetles are found in. Xerolinus is in the subtribe Opatrina within the tribe Opatrini.

== Distribution ==
Xerolinus is found in southern Florida and the West Indies, including the Lucayan Archipelago, the Greater Antilles, and the British Virgin Islands. The majority of described species are from the Cuban archipelago, although Ivie and Hart note that there will likely be even more species in the Lucayan Archipelago once its fauna become better studied. Most species in Xerolinus are endemic to a single island or to a group of islands corresponding to a single island in the Pleistocene. The eastern extreme of this genus's range is Great Camanoe.

== Description ==
Xerolinus species have an oval or elongate oval body length with a length of 4.5–11.0 mm (0.18–0.43 in).

== Species ==
As of 2018, the following thirty-one species are recognized:

- X. alfaroi (Garrido & Gutiérrez, 1996) — Cuba
- X. alutaceus (Casey, 1890) — USA (Florida), Cuba
- X. armasi (Marcuzzi, 1988) — Cuba
- X. bahamae (Marcuzzi, 1965) — The Bahamas
- X. bielawskii (Marcuzzi, 1985) — Cuba
- X. burtoni (Garrido & Gutiérrez, 1996) — Cayman Islands
- X. caguamensis (Marcuzzi, 1988) — Cuba
- X. camanoensis Hart & Ivie, 2016 — Virgin Islands
- X. caymanensis (Marcuzzi, 1977) — Cayman Islands
- X. cubanus (Marcuzzi, 1962) — Cuba
- X. dentipes (Marcuzzi, 1977) — Cuba, Cayman Islands
- X. difficilis (Marcuzzi, 1976) — Cuba
- X. dispar (Casey, 1890) — USA (Florida)
- X. dozieri (Marcuzzi, 1965) — Turks and Caicos Islands
- X. elongatus (Marcuzzi, 1976) — Cuba
- X. garridoi (Marcuzzi, 1988) — Cuba
- X. hernandezi (Marcuzzi, 1988) — Cuba (Isla de Juventud)
- X. juraguensis (Marcuzzi, 1988) — Cuba
- X. kulzeri (Marcuzzi, 1965) —The Bahamas (Mayaguana)
- X. macamboensis (Marcuzzi, 1988) — Cuba
- X. minor (Marcuzzi, 1977) — Cayman Islands
- X. orientalis (Garrido & Gutiérrez, 1996) — Cuba
- X. puncticeps (Mulsant & Rey, 1859) — Cuba
- X. rufoclavatus (Zayas, 1988) — Cuba
- X. sallei (Mulsant & Rey, 1859) — Hispaniola
- X. smalli (Garrido, 2004) — Cuba
- X. swearingenae Hart & Ivie, 2016 — Jamaica
- X. that (Steiner, 2006) — The Bahamas
- X. this (Steiner, 2006) — The Bahamas
- X. waterhousii (Mulsant & Rey, 1859) — Cuba
- X. zayasi (Marcuzzi, 1988) — Cuba

In addition, an undescribed species mentioned in Robert H. Turnbow Jr. and Michael C. Thomas's 2008 checklist of Bahamian coleoptera belongs to Xerolinus; Turnbow and Thomas had referred to it as "Diastolinus prob. n. sp." Ivie and Hart also noted that there are many other undescribed species as well as islands whose beetle species have not thoroughly been sampled.
