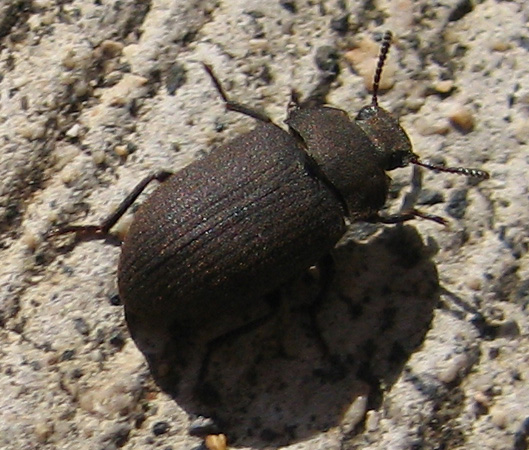
- Gonocephalum adpressiforme

Scientific classification
- Kingdom: Animalia
- Phylum: Arthropoda
- Class: Insecta
- Order: Coleoptera
- Suborder: Polyphaga
- Infraorder: Cucujiformia
- Family: Tenebrionidae
- Subfamily: Blaptinae
- Tribe: Opatrini; Brullé, 1832

Subtribes
- Ammobiina Desbrochers des Loges, 1902; Blapstinina Mulsant & Rey, 1853; Heterotarsina Blanchard, 1845; Neopachypterina Bouchard, Löbl & Merkl, 2007; Opatrina Brullé, 1832; Sclerina Lacordaire, 1859; Stizopodina Lacordaire, 1859

Diversity
- at least 120 genera

= Opatrini =

Tribe of beetles

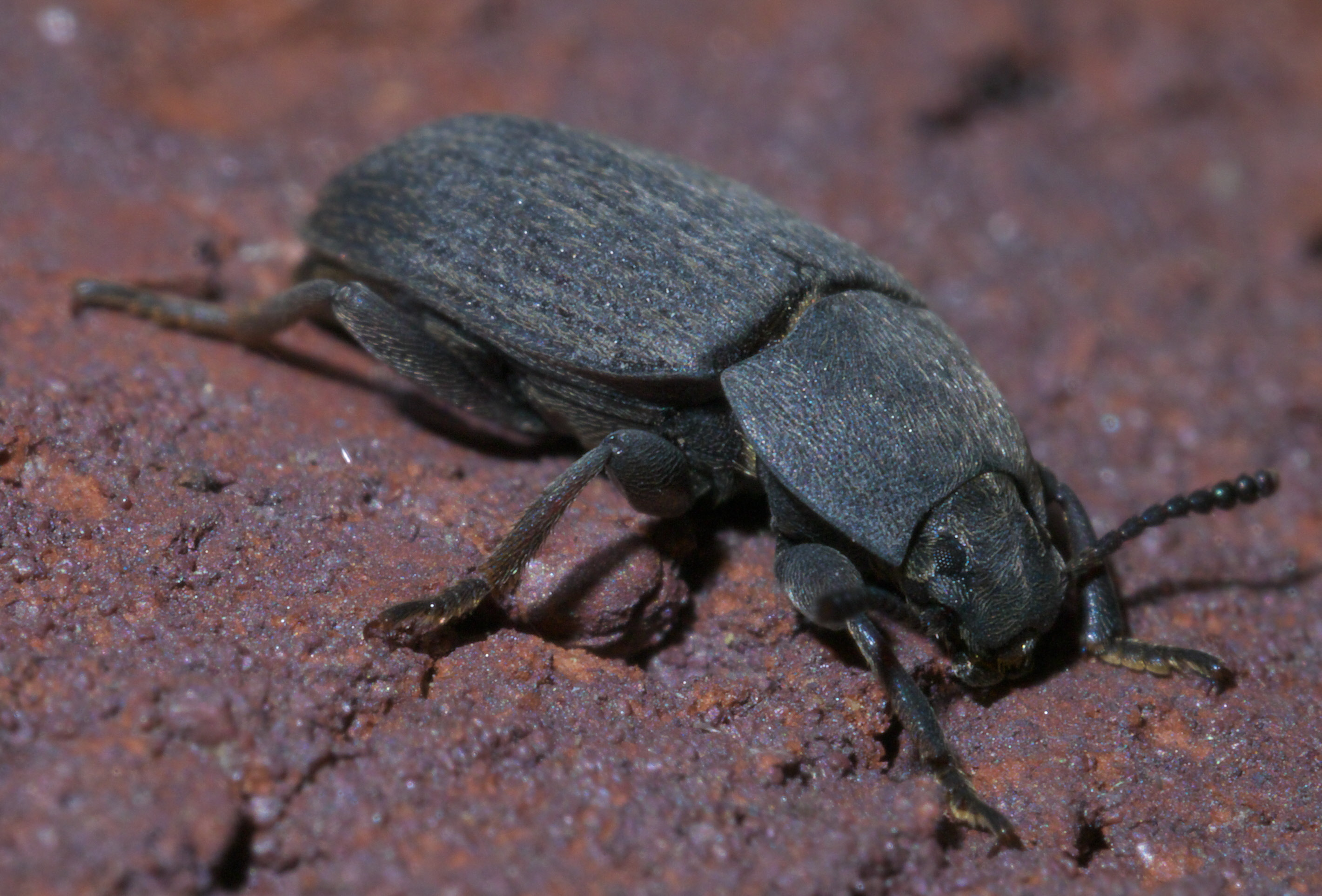
Opatrini

Opatrini is a tribe of darkling beetles (Tenebrionidae) in the subfamily Tenebrioninae.

In research by Kamiński et al. published in 2021, Opatrini and six other tribes were moved from Tenebrioninae to a newly resurrected subfamily,Blaptinae. These tribes contained 281 genera and about 4000 species, about 50% of Tenebrioninae. The new classification was followed by Bouchard et al. the same year.

Eupachypterus is a fossil genus of Opatrini, known from Oise amber found in Ypresian deposits of France, dating from more than 50 million years ago. It was already quite similar to some existing Opatriini, such as Neopachypterus and Pseudolamus.

== See also ==
- List of Opatrini genera
