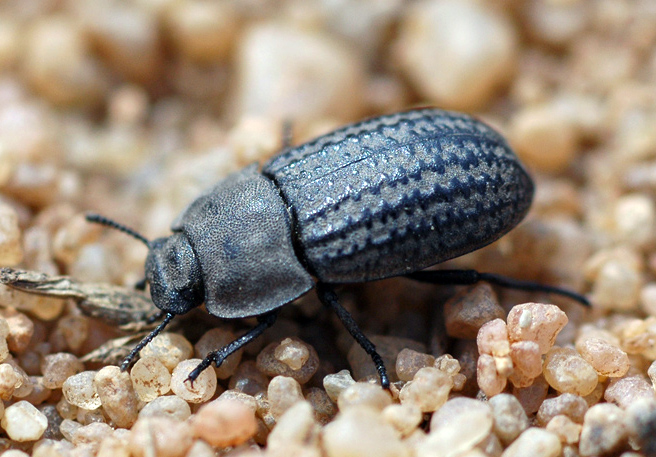
- Opatrum

Scientific classification
- Domain: Eukaryota
- Kingdom: Animalia
- Phylum: Arthropoda
- Class: Insecta
- Order: Coleoptera
- Suborder: Polyphaga
- Infraorder: Cucujiformia
- Family: Tenebrionidae
- Genus: Opatrum; Fabricius, 1775

= Opatrum =

Genus of beetles

Opatrum is a genus of beetles belonging to the family Tenebrionidae.

The species of this genus are found in Eurasia.

Species:

- Opatrum alternatum Kuster, 1849
- Opatrum asperidorsum Fairmaire, 1878
