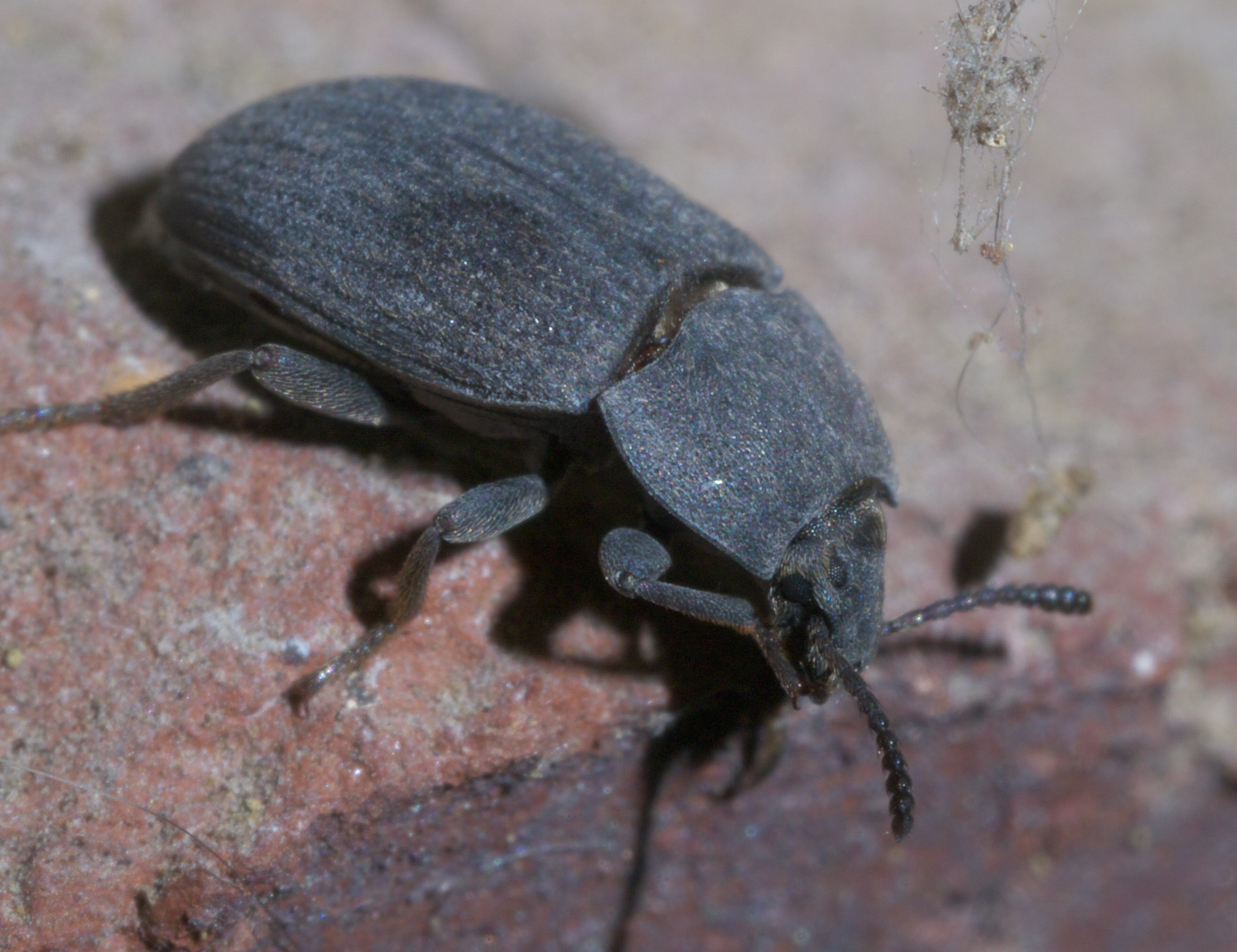
- Blapstinus
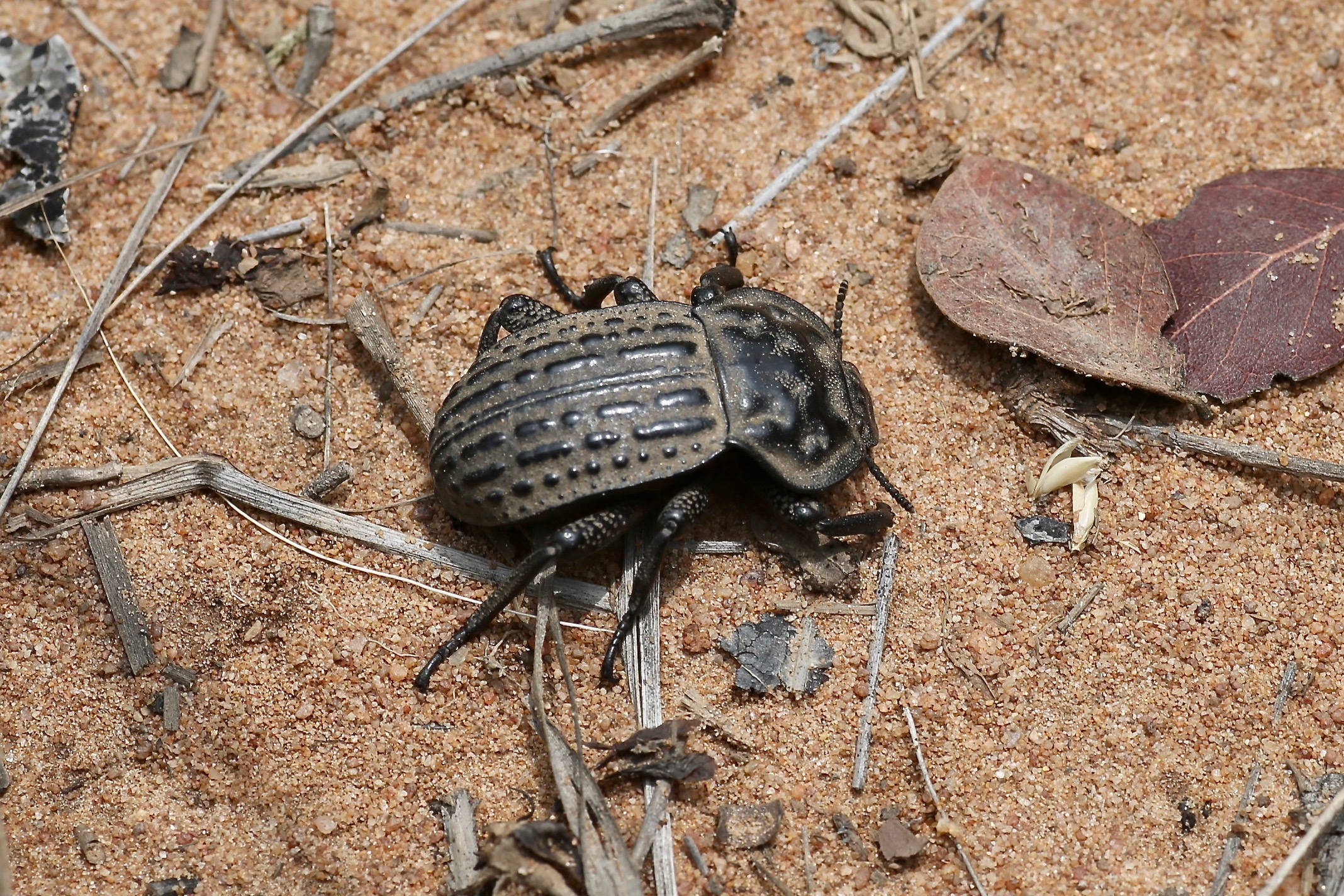

Scientific classification
- Kingdom: Animalia
- Phylum: Arthropoda
- Clade: Pancrustacea
- Class: Insecta
- Order: Coleoptera
- Suborder: Polyphaga
- Infraorder: Cucujiformia
- Family: Tenebrionidae
- Subfamily: Blaptinae; Leach, 1815

Tribes
- Amphidorini LeConte, 1862; Blaptini Leach, 1815; Dendarini Mulsant & Rey, 1854; Dissonomini Medvedev, 1968; Opatrini Brullé, 1832; Pedinini Eschscholtz, 1829; Platynotini Mulsant & Rey, 1853; Platyscelidini Lacordaire, 1859

Diversity
- at least 300 genera

= Blaptinae =

Subfamily of darkling beetles

Blaptinae is a subfamily of darkling beetles in the family Tenebrionidae. There are around 300 genera in Blaptinae, divided into 8 tribes.

Based on morphological and molecular evidence, Kamiński et al. (2021) moved seven tribes from Tenebrioninae into the newly resurrected subfamily Blaptinae. In 2024, the tribe Dissonomini was added. The new classification has been widely accepted by scientific community Currently, the subfamily contains 283 genera and about 4000 species.

Blaptinae is one of the most widespread and abundant groups of darkling beetles in arid regions around the world. In several desert ecosystems, members of this subfamily form a dominant part of the local invertebrate fauna—for example Gonopus tibialis (sandworm beetle) in Namib or Parastizopus armaticeps in Kalahari.

Ovoviviparity has been documented in certain species of the tribe Platynotina, where females have been observed carrying fully developed first-instar larvae within their bursa copulatrix.

== See also ==
- List of Blaptinae genera
