= Marcin Jan Kamiński =

Polish entomologist (born 1985)

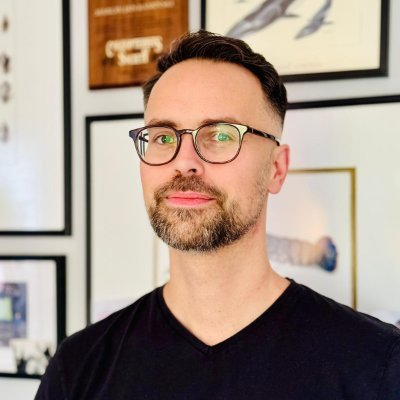
- Born: March 5, 1985 (age 41); Warsaw, Poland
- Education: PhD Zoology, Museum and Institute of Zoology, Polish Academy of Sciences (2014); Habilitation Zoology, Museum and Institute of Zoology, Polish Academy of Sciences (2019); Full Professorship (2023)
- Alma mater: University of Warsaw
- Known for: Research on darkling beetles (Coleoptera: Tenebrionidae)
- Scientific career
- Fields: Systematics, Taxonomy, Entomology Zoology
- Workplaces: Museum and Institute of Zoology, Polish Academy of Sciences Northern Arizona University Purdue University
- Website: www.kaminskientomo.org

Marcin Jan Kamiński (born 5 March 1985 in Warsaw) is a Polish entomologist and professor specializing in systematics, biogeography, and the morphological evolution of darkling beetles (Coleoptera: Tenebrionidae). He is a full professor, head of the Zoological Museum, and Deputy Director for Scientific Affairs at the Museum and Institute of Zoology of the Polish Academy of Sciences. His academic background includes postdoctoral research in insect systematics at Northern Arizona University and Purdue University.

Kamiński is the author of more than 70 original research papers on the phylogeny and taxonomy of Afrotropical beetles. In addition to systematic research, his work has encompassed developmental biology, functional anatomy, and the recovery of ancient insect DNA. He has also published books and papers on museology.

Kamiński has played a significant role in clarifying relationships within the darkling beetle family, including leading the reinstatement of the subfamily Blaptinae—a globally distributed lineage comprising over 280 genera and 4,000 species—designating the genus Mariazofia, and discovering more than 60 previously unrecognized species.

== Taxonomic contributions ==
Kamiński and his coauthors have described numerous new taxa, some of which were named in honor of prominent Polish scientists, including Maria Skłodowska-Curie, Alfred Tarski, and Stanisław Ulam. List of taxa described by Kamiński:

Subtribes:

- Palpomodina Kamiński & Gearner, 2022

Genera:

- Microphylacinus Iwan, Kamiński, Aalbu 2011
- Paraselinus Kamiński 2013
- Kochogaster Kamiński and Raś 2011
- Eichleria Kamiński 2015
- Pteroselinus Kamiński 2015
- Wolladrus Iwan & Kamiński 2016
- Toktokkus Kamiński & Gearner 2021
- Tibiocnodes Gearner & Kamiński 2021
- Tuberocnodes Gearner & Kamiński 2021
- Saeculum Kamiński, Kanda, Smith 2021
- Mariazofia Kamiński 2022
- Bouchardium Kamiński 2024
- Muelleropsectropus Lumen & Kamiński 2024

Species:

- Atrocrates coconatae Kamiński 2011
- Ectateus ursynowiensis Kamiński 2011
- Phylacinus fisheri Iwan, Kamiński, Aalbu 2011
- Phylacinus kavanaughi Iwan, Kamiński, Aalbu 2011
- Microphylacinus verendus Iwan, Kamiński, Aalbu 2011
- Angolositus lidiae Kamiński 2012
- Clastopus griswoldi Iwan, Kamiński, Aalbu 2012
- Lechius aalbui Iwan, Kamiński 2012
- Lechius longiclavis Iwan, Kamiński 2012
- Paraselinus iwani Kamiński 2013
- Quadrideres kaszabi Kamiński 2013
- Quadrideres rex Kamiński 2013
- Anchophthalmops neumanni Kamiński 2013
- Kochogaster gerardi Kamiński & Iwan 2013
- Schelodontes muellerae Iwan & Kamiński 2014
- Schelodontes nitidus Iwan & Kamiński 2014
- Schelodontes scarabaeoides Iwan & Kamiński 2014
- Schelodontes spinosis Iwan & Kamiński 2014
- Eichleria davidi Kamiński 2015
- Eichleria ostrowskii Kamiński 2015
- Zadenos jani Kamiński 2015
- Zadenos jozwiki Kamiński 2015
- Zadenos kaweckii Kamiński 2015
- Zadenos szatalowiczi Kamiński 2015
- Archaeoglenes gomyi Iwan & Kamiński 2015
- Archaeoglenes loebli Iwan & Kamiński 2015
- Archaeoglenes triplehorni Iwan & Kamiński 2015
- Quadrideres kazimierzi Kamiński 2015
- Atrocrates kandai Kamiński 2017
- Atrocrates smithi Kamiński 2017
- Schelodontes baviaanskloofensis Kamiński 2017
- Meglyphus mariae Kamiński 2017
- Pedinus infortunatus Iwan & Kamiński 2017
- Tragardhus (Mitragardhus) ewae Kamiński 2017
- Tragardhus (Mitragardhus) ryszardi Kamiński 2017
- Tragardhus (Mitragardhus) zuzannae Kamiński 2017
- Tragardhus (Tragardhus) jani Kamiński 2017
- Tragardhus (Tragardhus) majae Kamiński 2017
- Clitobius omanicus Purchart & Kamiński 2017
- Zoutpansbergia schoemani Kamiński & Schawaller 2018
- Anaxius bloubergensis Kamiński & Schoeman 2018
- Anaxius limpopoensis Kamiński & Schoeman 2018
- Anaxius meletsensis Kamiński & Schoeman 2018
- Anaxius pseudoloensus Kamiński & Schoeman 2018
- Bantodemus lajumaiensis Kamiński & Schoeman 2018
- Machleida banachi Kamiński, Kanda, Smith 2019
- Machleida flagstaffensis Kamiński, Kanda, Smith 2019
- Machleida tarskii Kamiński, Kanda, Smith 2019
- Machleida zofiae Kamiński 2019
- Toktokkus barclayi Kamiński & Gearner, 2020
- Toktokkus congolensis Kamiński & Gearner, 2020
- Toktokkus barclayi Kamiński & Gearner, 2020
- Toktokkus congolensis Kamiński & Gearner, 2020
- Ocnodes kruegeri Kamiński, Müller, Schawaller, Gearner, Smith 2021
- Tuberocnodes synhimboides Gearner & Kamiński 2021
- Saeculum zoologicum Kamiński, Kanda, Smith 2021
- Saeculum merkli Kamiński, Kanda, Smith 2021
- Toktokkus o-serraferrus Gearner, Lumen, Kamiński 2022
- Toktokkus mariae Kamiński 2022
- Psammodes sklodowskae Kamiński & Gearner 2022
- Phylacastus ancoralium Lumen & Kamiński 2023
- Phylacastus makskacymirowi Lumen & Kamiński 2023
- Stenolamus borowieci Kamiński, Lumen, Smith, Iwan 2023
- Archaeoglenes borowieci Iwan, Schawaller, Kamiński 2023
- Biolus brunoi Lumen & Kamiński 2023
- Eurynotus privisolum Lumen & Kamiński 2023
- Bouchardium chillygonzalesi Kamiński 2024
- Bouchardium mariae Kamiński 2024
- Toktokkus zofiae Kamiński 2024
- Psectrapus byki Lumen & Kamiński 2025
- Psectrapus simplicimentulum Lumen & Kamiński 2025
- Ograbies calumnus Lumen & Kamiński 2025
- Isoncophallus crispiformus Lumen & Kamiński 2025
- Isoncophallus ovanullum Lumen & Kamiński 2025
- Phaleriderma iwani Lumen & Kamiński 2025
- Psectrapus distaticum Lumen & Kamiński 2025
- Psectrapus latimentulum Lumen & Kamiński 2025
- Schyzoschelus aetheculus Lumen & Kamiński 2025

== Selected publications ==
10. Kamiński M.J., Gearner O.M, Raś M., Hunsinger E.T., Smith A.L., Mas-Peinado P., Girón J.C., Bilska A.G., Strümpher W.P., Wirth C.C., Kanda K., Swichtenberg K., Iwan D., Smith A.D. 2022. Female terminalia morphology and cladistic relations among Tok-Tok beetles (Tenebrionidae: Sepidiini). Cladistics, Female terminalia morphology and cladistic relations among Tok-Tok beetles (Tenebrionidae: Sepidiini)

9. Smith A.D., Kamiński M.J., Kanda K., Sweet, A.D., Betancourt J.L., Holmgren C.A., Hempel E., Alberti F., Hofreiter, M. 2021. Recovery and analysis of ancient beetle DNA from subfossil packrat middens using high-throughput sequencing. Scientific Reports, Recovery and analysis of ancient beetle DNA from subfossil packrat middens using high-throughput sequencing

8. Kamiński, M.J., Gearner, O.M, Kanda, K., Swichtenberg, K., Purchart, L. & Smith, A.D. 2021. First insights into the phylogeny of tok-tokkie beetles (Tenebrionidae: Molurina, Phanerotomeina), and examination of the status of the Psammodes vialis species-group. Zoological Journal of the Linnean Society, 191: 883–901 "doi.org/10.1093/zoolinnean/zlaa052". doi.org. doi:10.1093/zoolinnean/zlaa052.

7. Kamiński, M.J., Lumen, R., Kanda, K., Iwan, D., Johnston, M.A., Kergoat, G., Bouchard, P., Bai, X-L., Li, X.-M., Ren, G.-D., Smith A.D. 2021. Reevaluation of Blapimorpha and Opatrinae: addressing a major phylogeny-classification gap in darkling beetles (Coleoptera: Tenebrionidae: Blaptinae). Systematic Entomology, 46(1): 140-156 "syen". doi.org. doi:10.1111/syen.12453.

6. Iwan, D., Löbl, I., Bouchard P., Bousquet, Y., Kamiński, M., Merkl O, Ando, K., Schawaller, W. 2020. Family TENEBRIONIDAE Latreille, 1802 in Catalogue of Palaearctic Coleoptera Volume 5, Tenebrionoidea Revised and Updated Second Edition by Iwan, D., Löbl., I. Brill NV, Leiden, The Netherlands, 969pp [ISBN 978-90-04-43498-1] Tenebrionoidea

5. Johnston, M.A., Smith, A.D., Matsumoto, K., Kamiński, M.J. 2020. On the taxonomic placement of Penichrus Champion, 1885 and a synopsis of North American Opatrini (Coleoptera: Tenebrionidae: Blaptinae). Annales Zoologici, 70: 765–774. https://doi.org/10.3161/00034541ANZ2020.70.4.017

4. Lumen R, Kanda K, Iwan D, Smith AD, Kamiński MJ. 2019. Molecular insights into the phylogeny of Blapstinina (Coleoptera: Tenebrionidae: Opatrini). Systematic Entomology, Molecular insights into the phylogeny of Blapstinina (Coleoptera: Tenebrionidae: Opatrini)

3. Kamiński MJ, Lumen R, Kubicz M, Steiner W, Kanda K, Iwan D. 2019. Immature stages of beetles representing the 'Opatrinoid' clade (Coleoptera: Tenebrionidae): an overview of current knowledge of the larval morphology and some resulting taxonomic notes on Blapstinina. Zoomorphology, Immature stages of beetles representing the 'Opatrinoid' clade (Coleoptera: Tenebrionidae): an overview of current knowledge of the larval morphology and some resulting taxonomic notes on Blapstinina

2. Kamiński MJ, Kanda K, Lumen R, Smith AD, Iwan D. 2018. Molecular phylogeny of Pedinini (Coleoptera, Tenebrionidae) and its implications for higher-level classification. Zoological Journal of the Linnean Society, Molecular phylogeny of Pedinini (Coleoptera, Tenebrionidae) and its implications for higher-level classification

1. Kaminski MJ, Kanda K, Raś M, Smith AD. 2017. Pythiopina, an enigmatic subtribe of darkling beetles (Coleoptera: Tenebrionidae: Pedinini): taxonomic revision, microtomography, ecological niche models and phylogenetic position. Systematic Entomology, 43: 147–165, https://doi.org/10.1111/syen.12255
