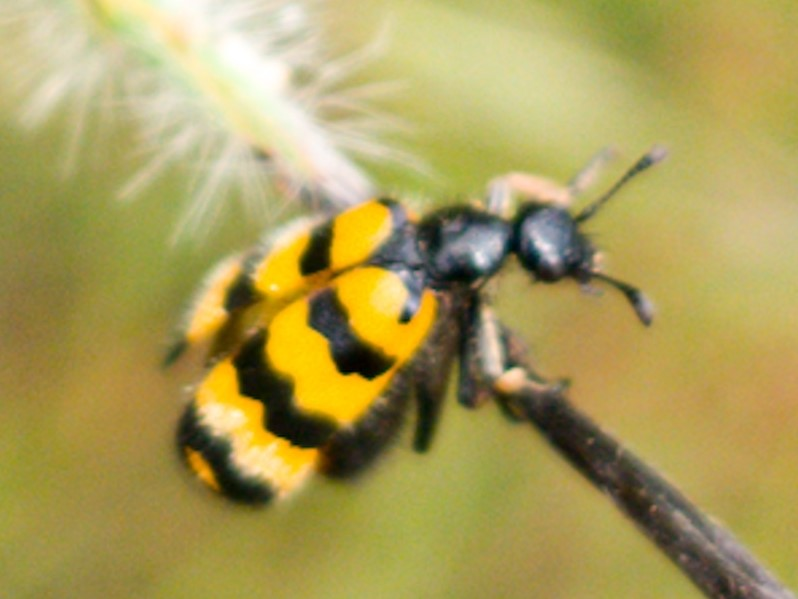

Scientific classification
- Kingdom: Animalia
- Phylum: Arthropoda
- Class: Insecta
- Order: Coleoptera
- Suborder: Polyphaga
- Infraorder: Cucujiformia
- Family: Meloidae
- Genus: Hycleus
- Species: H. rouxi

Binomial name
- Hycleus rouxi (Laporte de Castelnau, 1840)

Synonyms
- List: Decatoma rouxi Laporte de Castelnau, 1840; Decapotoma rouxi Borchmann, 1917; Mylabris (Gonizia) rouxi Pardo Alcaide, 1958; Mylabris recognita Walker, 1858; Decapotoma recognita Blair, 1921; Decatoma ceylonica var. andrewesi Borchmann, 1940; Coryna ceylonica Borchmann, 1940

= Hycleus rouxi =

Species of beetle

Hycleus rouxi is a species of blister beetle found in India and Sri Lanka.

== Description ==
Body length is 9.8–13.2 millimetres (0.39–0.52 in), the head is 1.3–1.8 millimetres (0.05–0.07 in) long.
