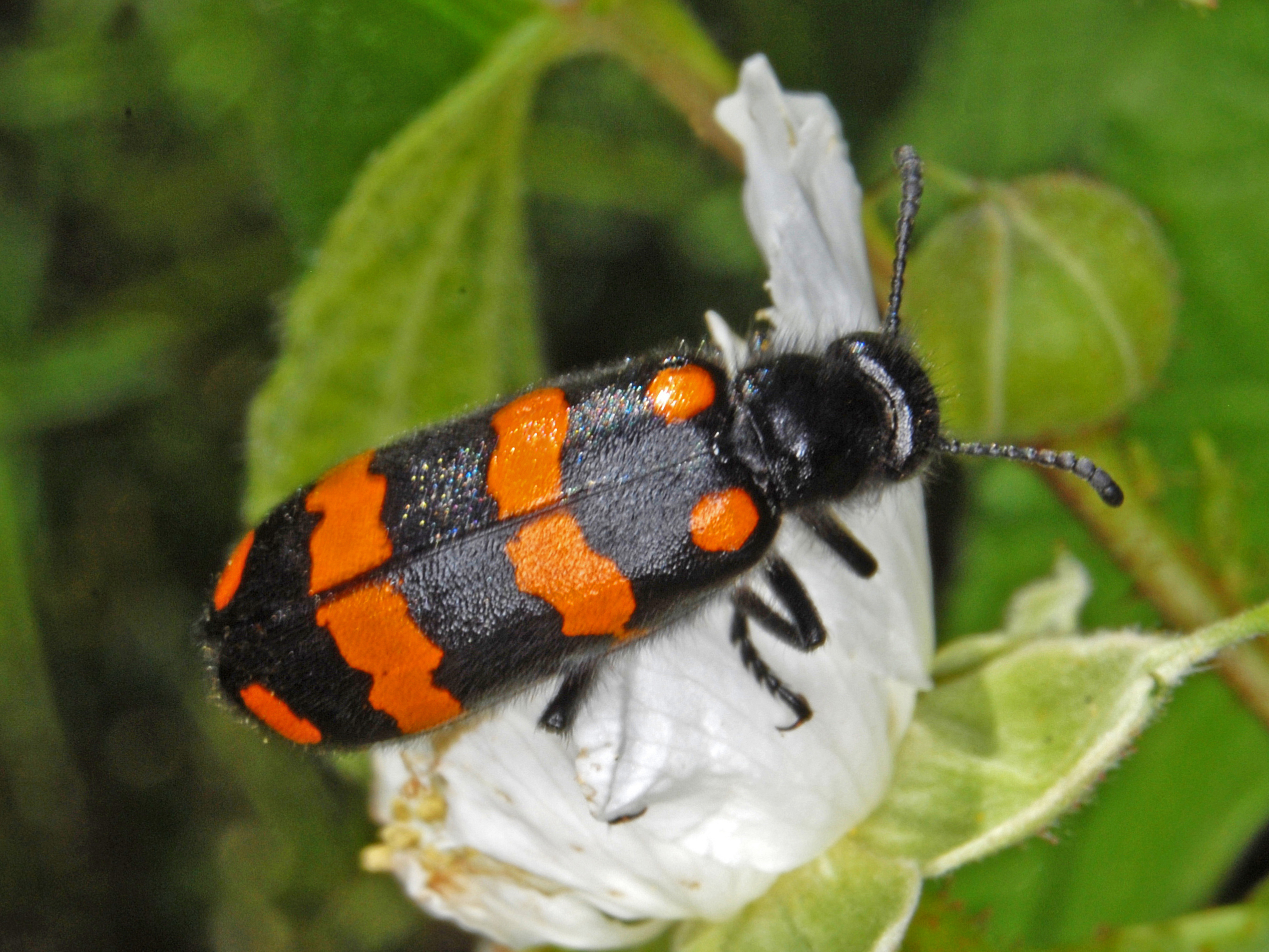
- Dorsal view

Scientific classification
- Kingdom: Animalia
- Phylum: Arthropoda
- Class: Insecta
- Order: Coleoptera
- Suborder: Polyphaga
- Infraorder: Cucujiformia
- Family: Meloidae
- Genus: Hycleus
- Species: H. polymorphus

Binomial name
- Hycleus polymorphus (Pallas, 1771)

Synonyms
- Mylabris polymorpha (Pallas, 1771); Attelabus polymorphus Pallas, 1771

= Hycleus polymorphus =

Species of beetle

Hycleus polymorphus is a species of Blister Beetles belonging to the family Meloidae subfamily Meloinae.

== Distribution and habitat ==
These beetles are present in most of Europe, in the Near East, and in the eastern Palearctic realm. They occur mainly in mountainous areas.

== Description ==
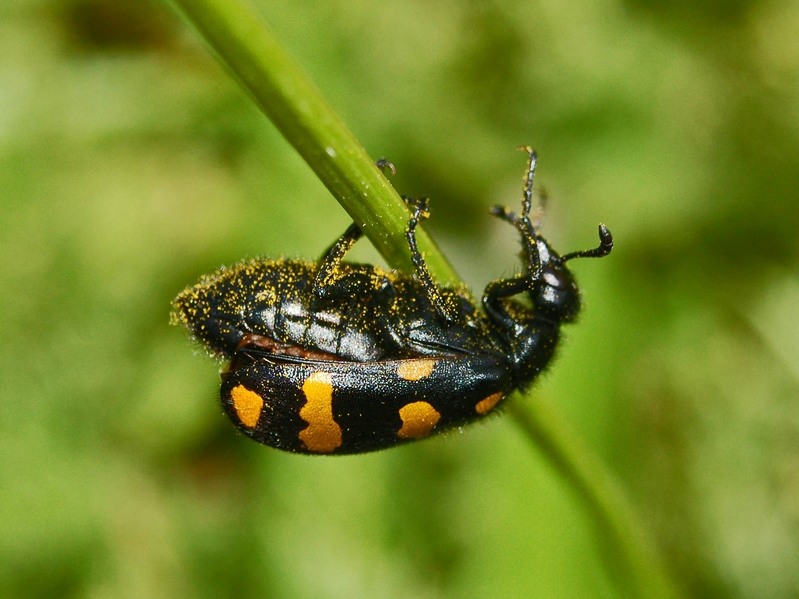
Hycleus polymorphus - female

The adults of Hycleus polymorphus grow up to 11–20 millimetres (0.43–0.79 in) long. These beetles have an elongate soft body, with a long erect black hair on the pronotum and on the head. They are completely black, with yellow-orange stripes on elytra and two yellow-orange spots enclosed in the apical dark bands. They have very different colourful patterns (hence the Latin word polymorphus). Anterior and middle black bands of elytra extend to outer border and along suture.

This species is very similar to Mylabris variabilis, but in the latter the apical spots are missing, while there are more or less extended black bands.

== Biology ==
Adults can be encountered on flowers from July through August, mainly feeding on Asteraceae and Fabaceae species.

The larval stage of these insects is quite complex, as they are characterized by hypermetamorphosis, a kind of complete insect metamorphosis in which, in addition to the normal stages of larva, nymph and imago, they have several others, with great differences in appearance and way of life.

The female of Hycleus polymorphus lays her eggs in the soil. The first-stage larvae move to find an ootheca of grasshoppers, as these beetles are predators of Acridids eggs (Acrididae species, especially locusts), being a natural control agent. In the eggs of their victims they start a new cycle of metamorphosis.
