= Mylabris ceylonica =

Scientific classification
- Kingdom: Animalia
- Phylum: Arthropoda
- Class: Insecta
- Order: Coleoptera
- Suborder: Polyphaga
- Infraorder: Cucujiformia
- Family: Meloidae
- Genus: Mylabris
- Species: M. ceylonica

Binomial name
- Mylabris ceylonica (Pic, 1916)

Synonyms
- Zonabris ceylonica Pic, 1916

Species of beetle

Mylabris ceylonica, is a species of blister beetle endemic to Sri Lanka.

== Description ==
Body length is about 8 to 17 mm.

Adults are commonly found during March and June.
