= M. polymorpha =

M. polymorpha may refer to:

- Macrozamia polymorpha, a plant endemic to New South Wales, Australia
- Marchantia polymorpha, a large liverwort
- Martinia polymorpha, a perennial herb
- Medicago polymorpha, a plant native to the Mediterranean Basin
- Melanoides polymorpha, a freshwater snail
- Metrosideros polymorpha, an evergreen tree
- Mima polymorpha, a gram-negative bacterium
- Mitra polymorpha, a sea snail
- Mitrasacme polymorpha, a perennial herb
- Moquinia polymorpha, a sunflower native to Brazil, Bolivia, and Paraguay
- Moraxella polymorpha, a gram-negative bacterium
- Munidopsis polymorpha, a squat lobster
- Mycosphaerella polymorpha, a plant pathogen
- Mylabris polymorpha, a blister beetle
