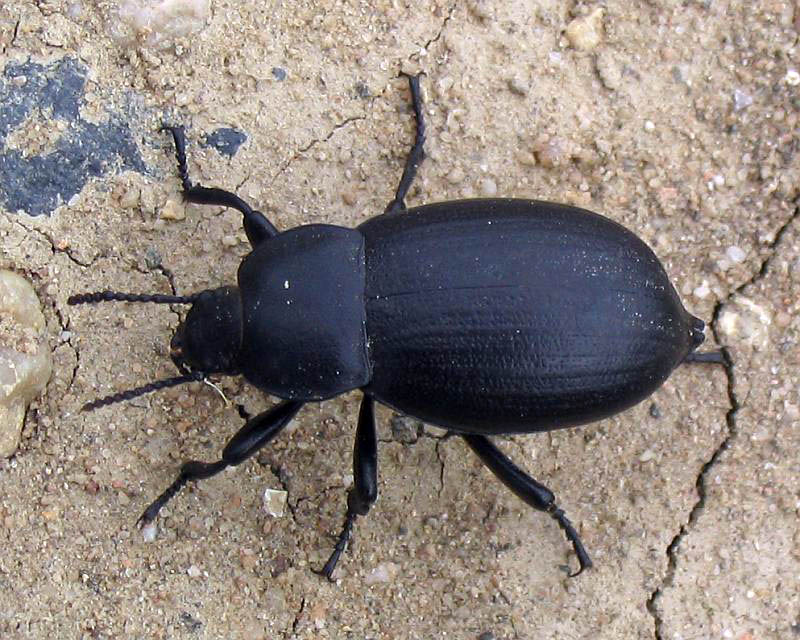
- Blaps lethifera
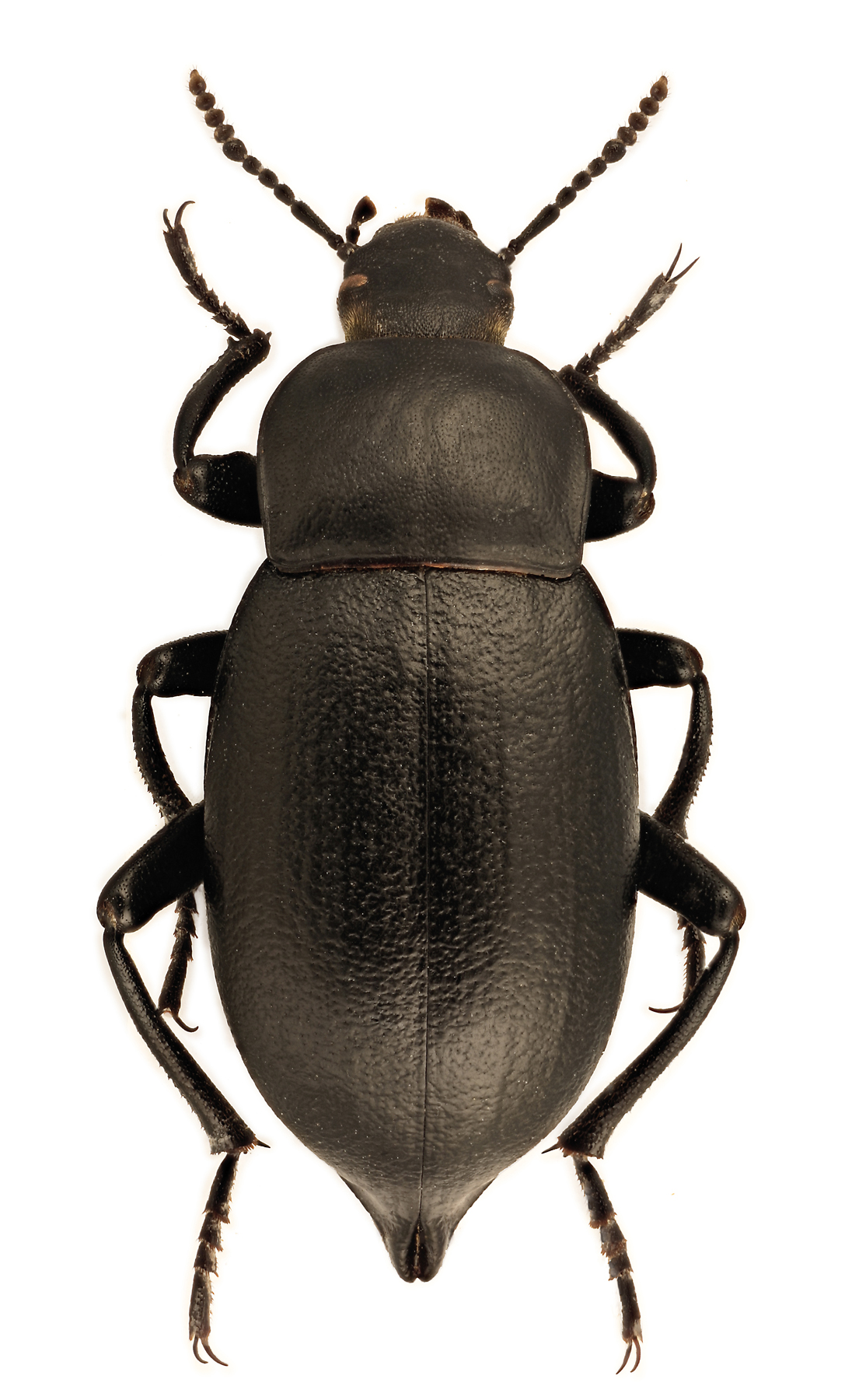
- Blaps lethifera

Scientific classification
- Kingdom: Animalia
- Phylum: Arthropoda
- Clade: Pancrustacea
- Class: Insecta
- Order: Coleoptera
- Suborder: Polyphaga
- Infraorder: Cucujiformia
- Family: Tenebrionidae
- Subfamily: Blaptinae
- Tribe: Blaptini
- Genus: Blaps; Fabricius 1775

Species
- See text

Synonyms
- List: Acanthoblaps Reitter, 1889; Agroblaps Motschoulsky, 1860; Arenoblaps Medvedev, 1999; Blapidium 1921; Blapidurus Fairmaire, 1891; Blapimorpha Motschoulsky, 1860; Blapisa Motschoulsky, 1860; Dineria Motschoulsky, 1860; Genoblaps Bauer, 1921; Hypoblaps Kolbe, 1928; Laraliprosodes Bogatchev, 1947; Leptocolena Allard, 1880; Lithoblaps Motschoulsky, 1860; Mesoblaps Bauer, 1921; Nalepa Reitter, 1887; Nanoblaps Semenov-Tjan-Shansky & Bogatchev, 1936; Notoblaps Bauer, 1921; Opisthoblaps Kolbe, 1928; Plaps Zschachi, 1778; Platyblaps Motschoulsky, 1860; Prosoblapsia Skopin & Kaszab, 1978; Rhizoblaps Motschoulsky, 1860; Uroblaps Motschoulsky, 1860

= Blaps =

Genus of darkling beetles

Blaps is a genus of darkling beetles that belong to the subfamily Blaptinae. They are most commonly found in Eurasia and Australia with occasinal sightings elsewhere in the world.

== Distribution ==
Similarly to other genera of the tribe Blaptini, members of this genus are primarily distributed in the Palearctic region where they can be commonly found in Eurasia and Australia with occasional sightings elsewhere in the world in regions such as North America. The species Blaps skopini and Blaps fouquei can be found in central and southern Kazakhstan. Iran contains around 24 described species and two species can be found in the Gobi Desert of Mongolia. Species of the subgenus Nalepa can be found distributed across the Tibetan Plateau in the Chinese provinces of southern Qinghai, northwestern Sichuan, and eastern Xizang.

== Taxonomy ==
Blaps is a genus of cucujiform beetles that belong to the family Tenebrionidae, also known as darkling beetles. Within the family they below to the subfamily Blaptinae and more specifically to the tribe Blaptini (subtribe Blaptina). Blaptina is the most species-rich subtribe in Blaptini that comprises 11 genera with nearly 350 species.

The genus is currently divided into four subgenera; Ablapsis, Arenoblaps, Blaps, Dineria and Nalepa. The most species-rich subgenus is Blaps which contains more than 180 species with Ablapsis being the second most species-rich subgenus with around 20 species. Subgenus Dineria, Arenoblaps and Nalepa contain only two, one and seven species respectively.

=== Taxonomic history ===
The genus was described in 1775 by Danish zoologist Johan Christian Fabricius. Since its description, the taxonomy of Blaps has been complicated and confusing with molecular studies indicating the genus to be paraphyletic. Species of the Southern Caucasus (Transcaucasia) and Iran are well-studied however also have unclear taxonomy.

The genus Nalepa was described as a subgenus of Blaps in 1887 by Austrian entomologist Edmund Reitter. He would describe Blaps cylindracea as the type species of Nalepa. In 1893, Reitter would elevate the status of Nalepa as its own genus. The genus would come to be comprised of seven species that were distributed across the Tibetan Plateau in the provinces of southern Qinghai, northwestern Sichuan, and eastern Xizang in China. Despite its elevation to be its own genus, it required verification, particularly with molecular data, on the genus monophyly and its phylogenetic placement within the tribe Blaptini. In 2025, Nalepa would be moved back as a subgenus of Blaps on the bases of both molecular and morphological evidence.

=== Species ===
The genus currently contains more than 200 described species making it the most species-rich genus within the subtribe Blaptina. Below is a partial list of species:

- Blaps abbreviata Menetries, 1836
- Blaps abdita Picka, 1978
- Blaps alternans Brulle, 1838
- Blaps bedeli Chatanay, 1914
- Blaps bipunctata Allard, 1880
- Blaps brevicornis Seidlitz, 1893
- Blaps foveicollis Allard, 1880
- Blaps gibba Laporte de Castelnau, 1840
- Blaps gigas (Linnaeus, 1767)
- Blaps graeca Solier, 1848
- Blaps halophila Fischer de Waldheim, 1820
- Blaps hispanica Solier, 1848
- Blaps holconota
- Blaps indagator Reiche, 1857
- Blaps kollari Seidlitz, 1893
- Blaps lethifera Marsham, 1802
- Blaps lusitanica Herbst, 1799
- Blaps milleri Seidlitz, 1893
- Blaps mortisaga (Linnaeus, 1758)
- Blaps mucronata Latreille, 1804 (cellar beetle)
- Blaps nitens Laporte de Castelnau, 1840
- Blaps ocreata Allard, 1880
- Blaps oertzeni Seidlitz, 1893
- Blaps orbicollis Motschulsky, 1845
- Blaps parvicollis Zoubkoff, 1829
- Blaps planicollis Motschulsky, 1845
- Blaps polychresta (Forskål, 1775)
- Blaps pruinosa Faldermann, 1833
- Blaps putrida Motschulsky, 1845
- Blaps robusta Motschulsky, 1845
- Blaps sinuaticollis Solier, 1848
- Blaps songorica Fischer de Waldheim, 1844
- Blaps splichali Gebien, 1913
- Blaps striola (Motschulsky, 1860)
- Blaps sulcata Laporte de Castelnau, 1840
- Blaps taeniolata Menetries, 1832
- Blaps tibialis Reiche, 1857
- Blaps waltli Seidlitz, 1893
