= Hycleus balteata =

Scientific classification
- Kingdom: Animalia
- Phylum: Arthropoda
- Clade: Pancrustacea
- Class: Insecta
- Order: Coleoptera
- Suborder: Polyphaga
- Infraorder: Cucujiformia
- Family: Meloidae
- Genus: Hycleus
- Species: H. balteata

Binomial name
- Hycleus balteata (Pallas, 1782)

Synonyms
- Meloe balteata Pallas, 1782; Mylabris balteata Marseul, 1872; Maloe punctum Fabricius, 1792; Mylabris punctum Billberg, 1813; Zonabris punctum var. puttalamensis Pic, 1912; Zonabris punctum var. singularipennis Pic, 1912

Species of beetle

Hycleus balteata, is a species of blister beetle found in India, and Sri Lanka.

== Description ==
Body length is about 8 to 17 mm.
