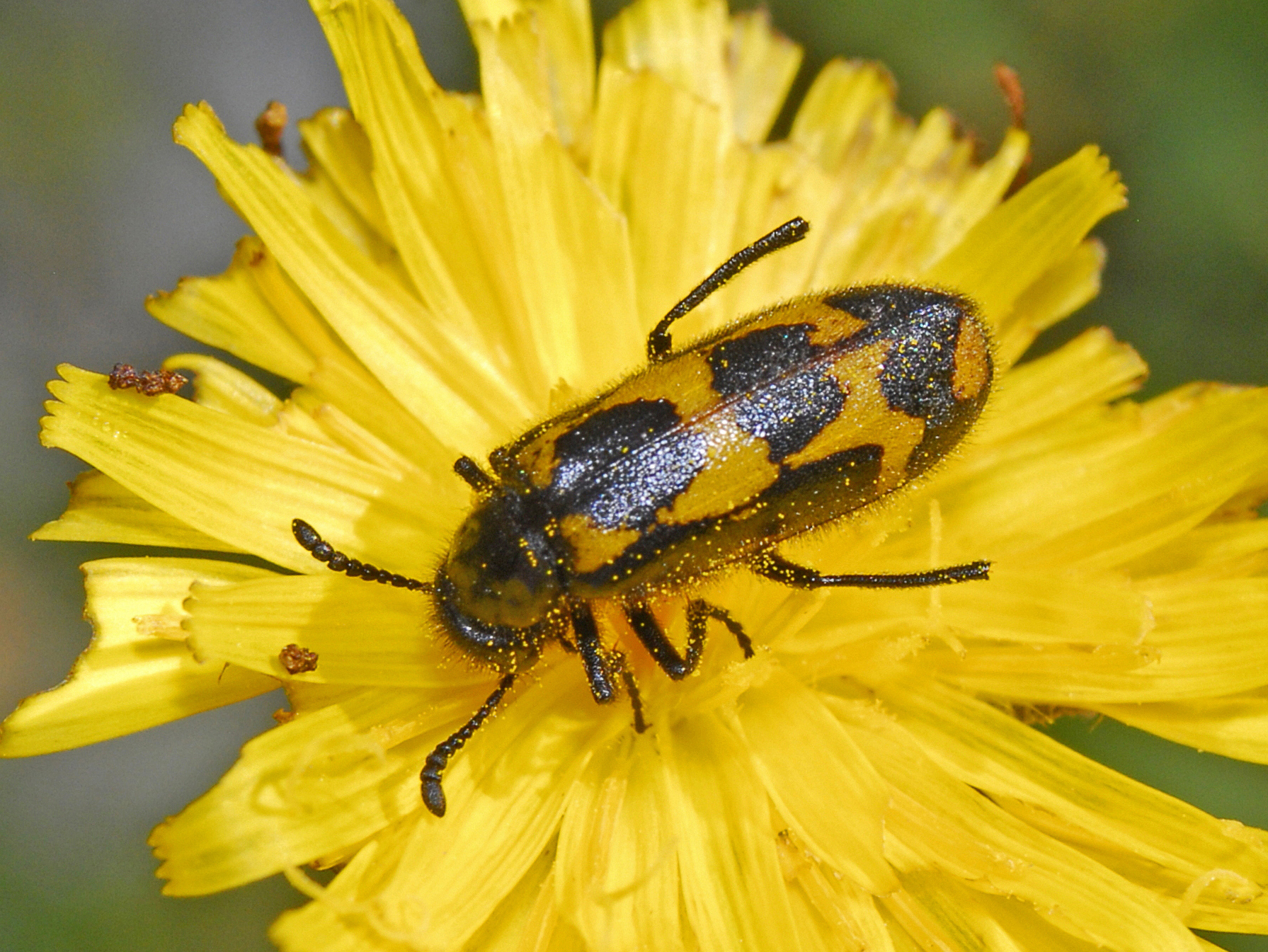
- Mylabris flexuosa, dorsal view
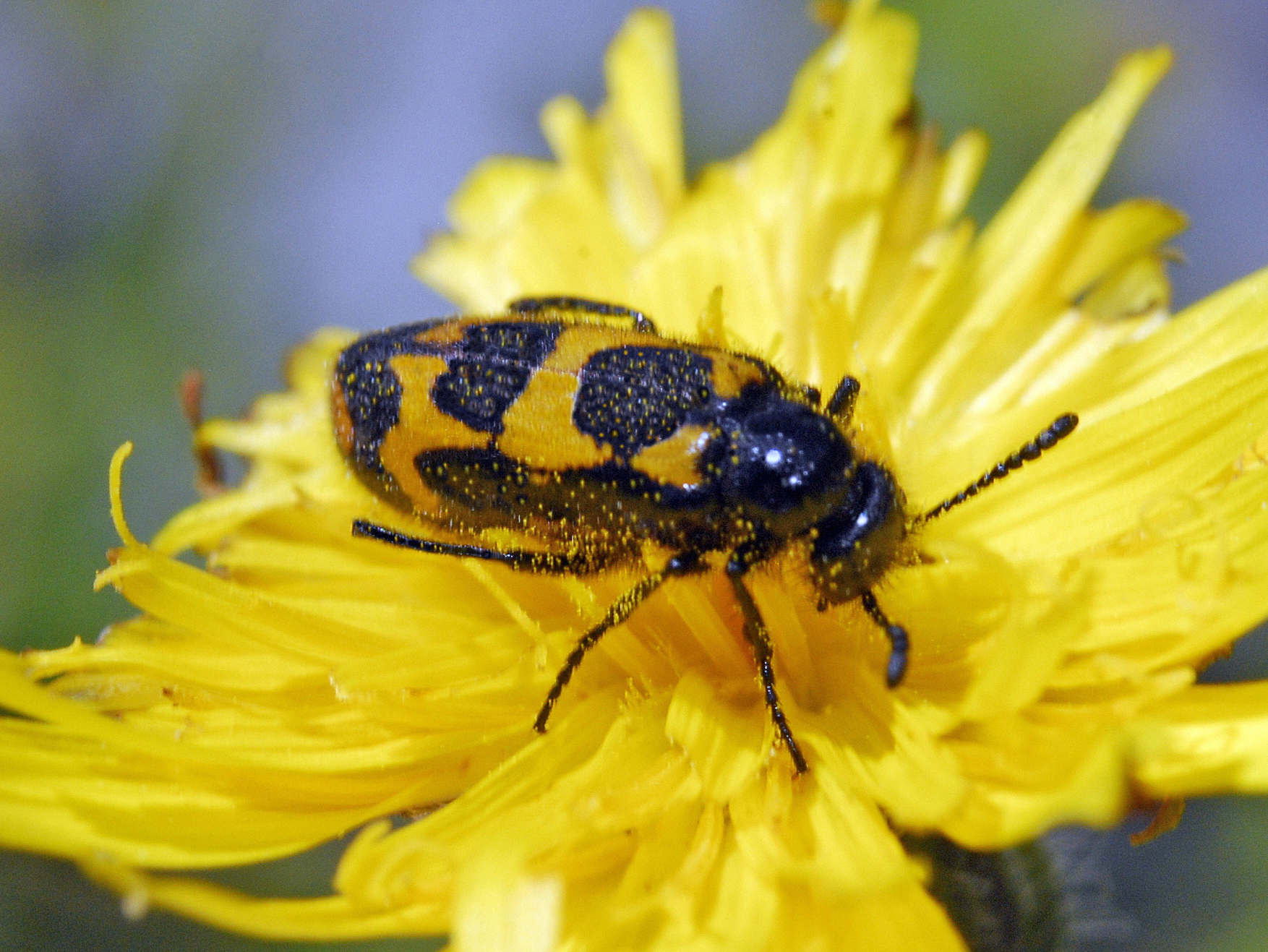
- Side view

Scientific classification
- Domain: Eukaryota
- Kingdom: Animalia
- Phylum: Arthropoda
- Class: Insecta
- Order: Coleoptera
- Suborder: Polyphaga
- Infraorder: Cucujiformia
- Family: Meloidae
- Genus: Mylabris
- Species: M. flexuosa

Binomial name
- Mylabris flexuosa Olivier, 1811

Synonyms
- Mylabris (Micrabris) abrutia Soumacov, 1915; Mylabris (Micrabris) aprutia Magistretti, 1943

= Mylabris flexuosa =

Species of beetle

Mylabris flexuosa is a species of blister beetle, belonging to the family Meloidae.

== Distribution and habitat ==
This species is present in Southern Europe (Andorra, France, Italy, Spain and Switzerland), in Russia and in Central Asia. It mainly inhabits prairies.

== Description ==
Mylabris flexuosa can reach a length of 10–12 millimetres (0.39–0.47 in). Head, antennae, pronotum and legs are black, while elytra show yellow and black bands and markings. It has an extensive and easily seen pubescence.

This species is similar to Mylabris variabilis.

== Bibliography ==
- Bologna, M.A., Cobolli Sbordoni, M., De Mattheis, E. & Mattoccia, M. (1988) Divergenza genetica tra popolazioni sud europee di Mylabris flexuosa Olivier (Coleoptera, Meloidae). Atti XV Congresso Nazionale Italiano di Entomologia, L'Aquila, 1988, 673–680.
