= Hycleus phaleratus =

Scientific classification
- Kingdom: Animalia
- Phylum: Arthropoda
- Clade: Pancrustacea
- Class: Insecta
- Order: Coleoptera
- Suborder: Polyphaga
- Infraorder: Cucujiformia
- Family: Meloidae
- Genus: Hycleus
- Species: H. phaleratus

Binomial name
- Hycleus phaleratus (Pallas, 1781)

Species of beetle

Hycleus phaleratus, is a species of blister beetle found in China, Taiwan, Thailand, Indonesia, Nepal, India, Sri Lanka, and Pakistan. It is sometimes considered a problem in agricultural cultivation but has been used in traditional Chinese medicine. The species was formerly placed in the genus Mylabris.

== Description ==
Body length is about 18 to 25.1 mm. Head with moderately coarse deep and dense punctures. Eyes longer and reniform. Maxillary palpi with triangular apical segment. Pronotum strongly convergent from apical third to apex. Pubescence long, and dense on pronotum. Elytra with moderately coarse, shallow punctures and short pubescence. Basal region consists with two yellowish spots. These spots become rectangular in shape from dorsally and laterally. The median and apical yellow bands are less undulate. Ventrum moderately and coarsely punctate and shiny. Male has shallowly emarginate sixth visible abdominal sternum, whereas female with entire apex in sixth visible abdominal sternum. Elytral axillary spot covered with black setae. Fore margins of the mesepisterna almost parallel which runs along the median groove. In male, proximal aedeagal hook is closer to the distal one.

In China, the beetle is important commercially in Chinese medicine, due to the ability to biosynthesize potent defensive blistering agent cantharidin. The beetle was traditionally used to treat tumors, carbuncle, scrofula, poor blood circulation, pleurisy, dropsy, pericarditis, and missed menstrual periods. Some side effects of the crude medicine obtained from H, phaleratus can cause abdominal pain and hemorrhagic shock.

Adults and grubs are pests on variety of agricultural crops and ornamentals such as: luffa, cowpea, Canna indica, rose, Gossypium hirsutum, green gram, okra, soy bean, tobacco and paddy.
