= Mylabris thunbergi =

Scientific classification
- Kingdom: Animalia
- Phylum: Arthropoda
- Class: Insecta
- Order: Coleoptera
- Suborder: Polyphaga
- Infraorder: Cucujiformia
- Family: Meloidae
- Genus: Mylabris
- Species: M. thunbergi

Binomial name
- Mylabris thunbergi (Billberg, 1813)

Synonyms
- Meloe thunbergi Billberg, 1813; Zonabris kandyana Pic, 1916

Species of beetle

Mylabris thunbergi is a species of blister beetle found in India, and Sri Lanka.

== Description ==
Body length is about 10.5 to 15.3 mm. Head is 1.4 to 2.2 mm long with coarse moderate punctures. Maxillary palpi with apical segment moderately compressed, and cylindrical. Pronotum with strongly rounded sides and a depression along median impressed line in middle region. Pronotum punctures are moderately coarse, deep and dense. Body covered with long, dense pubescence. Elytra with moderately coarse, deep, dense punctures. Basal and sub-apical bands of the elytra are yellowish or orange colored. There is a triangular black band found on basal region as well. A median black band visible constricted to center and another apical black band lunated laterally. There is a black spot at the suture behind median band.

Highly variable species in color, where three forms are identified from Sri Lanka according to sutural black spot on elytra: large spot, small spot, and spotless. Large spot and small spot forms are found from arid and dry zones of Northern Sri Lanka. Spotless form confined to central and southern parts of wet and dry zones. Based on elytral color, two forms are identified as: yellow form and orange form. Yellow form found from Northern regions, whereas orange form found from Southern regions of Sri Lanka.

== Biology ==
Primarily active throughout the year, they are mostly abundant during March and June. Adults and grubs are pests on variety of agricultural crops and ornamentals Adults show slight resistance to some common insecticides such as endosulfan, dichlorvos, carbaryl, chlorpyrifos.

== Host plants ==
- Abelmoschus esculentus
- Abutilon indicum
- Arachis hypogaea
- Cajanus cajan
- Cucurbita moschata
- Cyanotis cucullata
- Euphorbia hirta
- Indigofera viscosa
- Pithecellobium dulce
- Sida acuta
- Stylosanthes hamata
- Talinum fruticosum
- Tribulus terrestris
- Vigna mungo
- Vigna unguiculata
- Vigna radiata
