= Itagonia =

Scientific classification
- Domain: Eukaryota
- Kingdom: Animalia
- Phylum: Arthropoda
- Class: Insecta
- Order: Coleoptera
- Suborder: Polyphaga
- Infraorder: Cucujiformia
- Family: Tenebrionidae
- Subfamily: Blaptinae
- Tribe: Blaptini
- Subtribe: Gnaptorinina
- Genus: Itagonia; Reitter, 1887

Type species
- Itagonia gnaptorinoides Reitter, 1887

Genus of beetle

Itagonia is a genus of beetles in the family Tenebrionidae. The majority of species are found in Southwest China, but two are found in the more central and northern parts of the country, from Gansu to Hebei and Inner Mongolia. They are relatively small and robust-bodied beetles.

== Species ==
The following species are accepted within Itagonia:

- Itagonia baxoica Liu & Ren, 2009
- Itagonia bisetosa Medvedev, 1998
- Itagonia cordiformis Shi & Ren, 2007
- Itagonia elegans Medvedev, 1998
- Itagonia gnaptorinoides Reitter, 1887
- Itagonia litangensis Shi, 2013
- Itagonia longicornis Shi & Ren, 2007
- Itagonia medvedevi Shi et al., 2010
- Itagonia mera Medvedev, 1998
- Itagonia provostii Fairmaire, 1888
- Itagonia semenovi Reitter, 1889
- Itagonia shamaevi Medvedev, 2004
- Itagonia szetschwana Schuster, 1923
- Itagonia tibialis Shi, 2013
- Itagonia trisetosa Medvedev, 1998
- Itagonia tuberculata Shi et al., 2010
- Itagonia xinlongensis Shi et al., 2010
- Itagonia zayica Shi & Ren, 2007
