= Mylabris orientalis =

Scientific classification
- Kingdom: Animalia
- Phylum: Arthropoda
- Class: Insecta
- Order: Coleoptera
- Suborder: Polyphaga
- Infraorder: Cucujiformia
- Family: Meloidae
- Genus: Mylabris
- Species: M. orientalis

Binomial name
- Mylabris orientalis Marseul, 1872

Species of beetle

Mylabris orientalis, is a species of blister beetle found in India and Sri Lanka.

== Description ==
Body length is about 27.4 mm.
