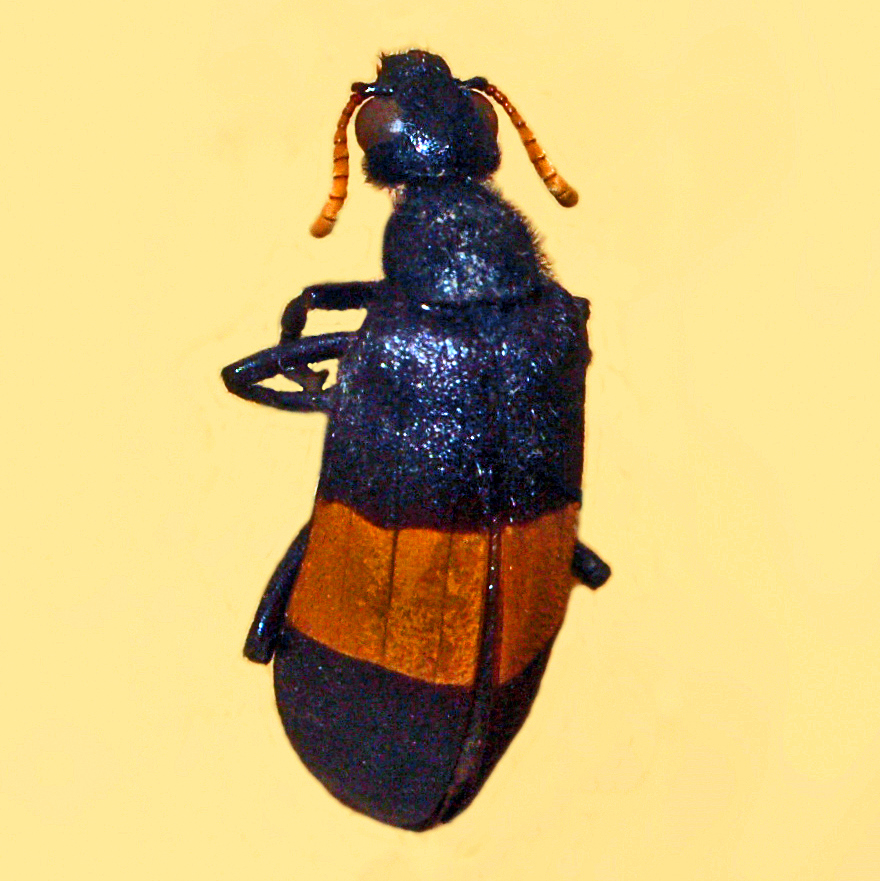
- Mylabris sennae from Somalia

Scientific classification
- Domain: Eukaryota
- Kingdom: Animalia
- Phylum: Arthropoda
- Class: Insecta
- Order: Coleoptera
- Suborder: Polyphaga
- Infraorder: Cucujiformia
- Family: Meloidae
- Genus: Mylabris
- Species: M. sennae

Binomial name
- Mylabris sennae Gestro, 1895

= Mylabris sennae =

Species of beetle

Mylabris sennae is a species of beetle belonging to the Meloidae family.

== Distribution ==
This species occurs in Eastern Africa.
