= Mylabris festiva =

Scientific classification
- Domain: Eukaryota
- Kingdom: Animalia
- Phylum: Arthropoda
- Class: Insecta
- Order: Coleoptera
- Suborder: Polyphaga
- Infraorder: Cucujiformia
- Family: Meloidae
- Genus: Mylabris
- Species: M. festiva

Binomial name
- Mylabris festiva (Pallas, 1773)

Synonyms
- Meloe festiva Pallas, 1773; Meloe sericea Pallas, 1782

Species of beetle

Mylabris festiva is a species of blister beetle, belonging to the family Meloidae. It is found in south-eastern Europe.
