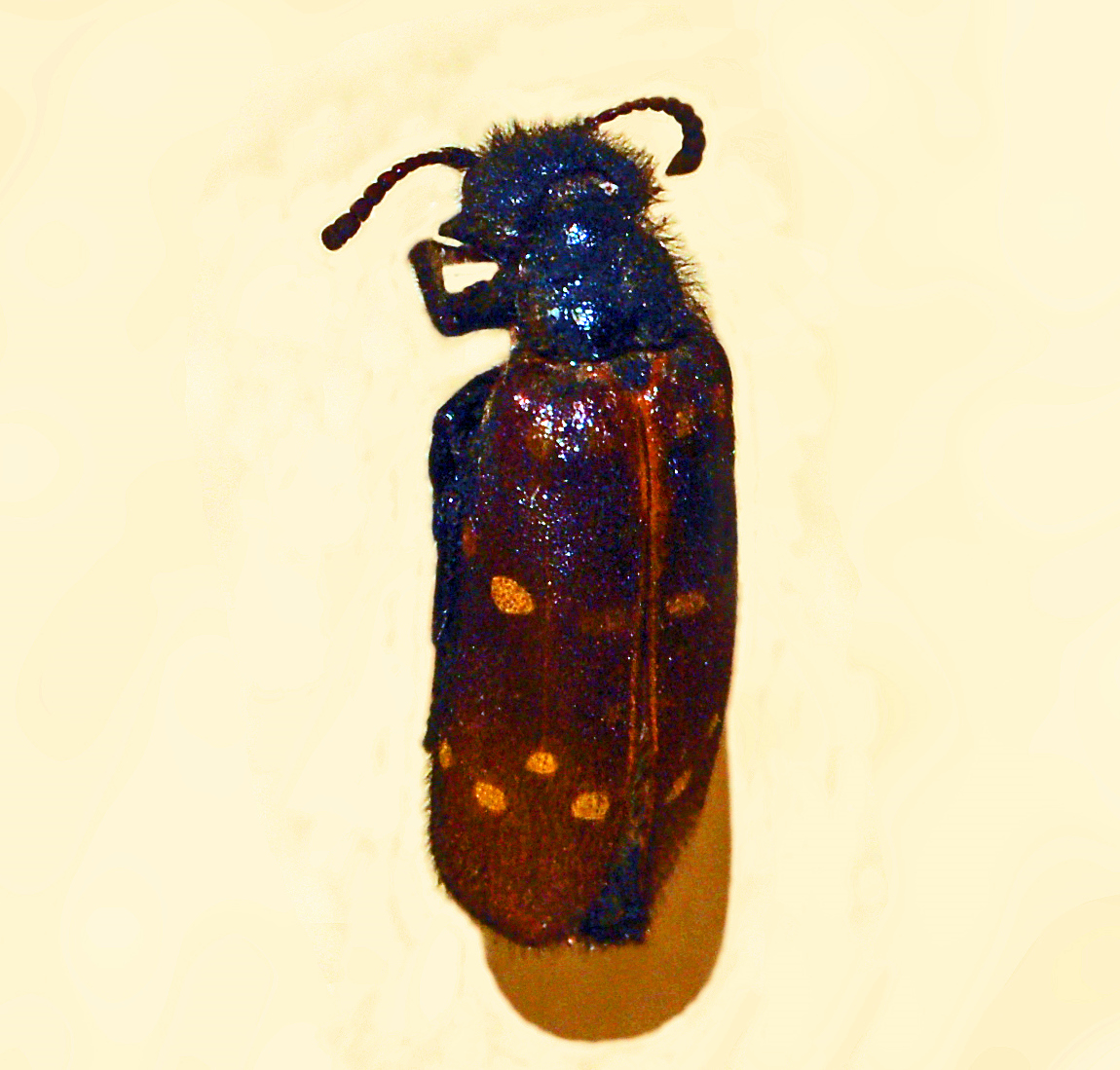
- Mylabris flavoguttata from Ethiopia

Scientific classification
- Kingdom: Animalia
- Phylum: Arthropoda
- Class: Insecta
- Order: Coleoptera
- Suborder: Polyphaga
- Infraorder: Cucujiformia
- Family: Meloidae
- Genus: Mylabris
- Species: M. flavoguttata

Binomial name
- Mylabris flavoguttata Reiche in Ferret & Galin, 1850

= Mylabris flavoguttata =

Species of beetle

Mylabris flavoguttata is a species of beetle belonging to the Meloidae family. It was discovered during an exploration of Abyssinia by Pierre Victor Adolphe Ferret and Joseph Germain Galinier (1814–1888).

== Distribution ==
This species occurs in Ethiopia and Angola.
