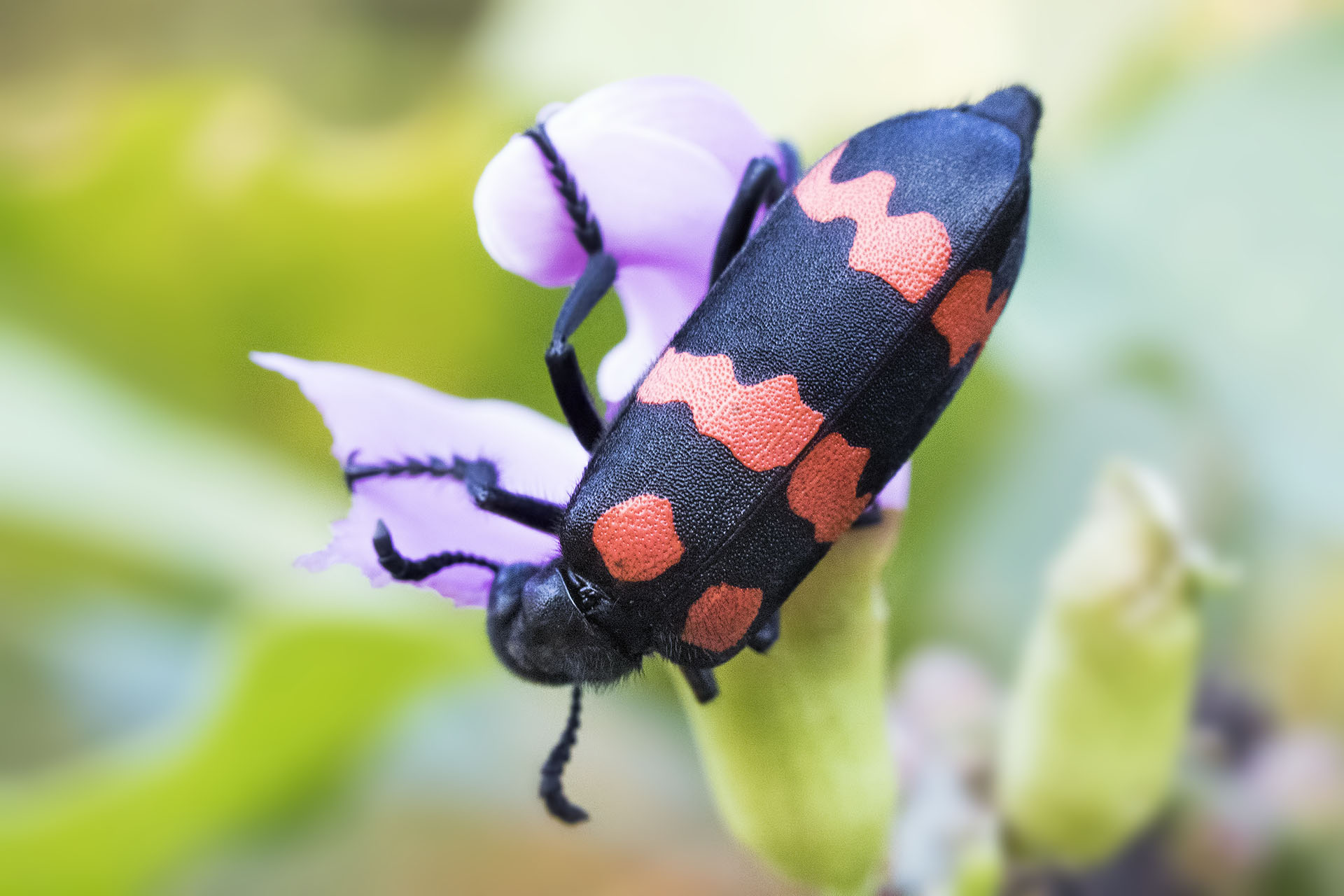

Scientific classification
- Kingdom: Animalia
- Phylum: Arthropoda
- Clade: Pancrustacea
- Class: Insecta
- Order: Coleoptera
- Suborder: Polyphaga
- Infraorder: Cucujiformia
- Family: Meloidae
- Genus: Hycleus
- Species: H. biundulatus

Binomial name
- Hycleus biundulatus (Pallas, 1782)

Synonyms
- Meloe pustulams Thunberg, 1791; Mylabris pustulata Olivier, 1795; Mylabris humeralis Walker, 1858

= Hycleus biundulatus =

Species of beetle

Hycleus biundulatus is a species of blister beetle found in India, Sri Lanka, China, Java, and Pakistan.

Adults feed mainly on flowers from a wide range of plant families. The first larval instar is an active triungulin form that is a predator of soft insects such as aphids. While the young are often beneficial to crops by suppressing other plant feeders, the adults can be a problem when present in large numbers. Flower feeding leads to lower yield and this can be a problem in some leguminous crops. They are however easily controlled by manual collection.

== Description ==
Body length is about 15.4 to 32.8 mm. Head and pronotum with moderately coarse deep and dense punctures. Eyes reniform. Maxillary palpi consists with strongly compressed, triangular apical segment. Pronotum has a middle region with depression along median impressed line. Elytra with moderately coarse, moderately deep and deeply punctures. Elytra pubescence is short, very dense on black area, but sparse on red area. Basal region consists with two reddish spots. These spots become rectangular in shape from dorsally and laterally. Ventrum moderately coarsely punctate, opaque. Male has deep, round emarginate sixth visible abdominal sternum, in which female is entire or feebly emarginate.

== Biology ==
It is a phytophagous beetle that exhibits polyphagy. Adult is considered as a major pest for the pigeon pea. It feeds on flowers and developing pods of the many agricultural crops such as Hibiscus rosa-sinensis, Pavonia zeylanica, Helicteres isora, Cassia occidentalis, Acacia caesia, Cleome viscosa, Zea mays, Mangifera indica, Murraya koenigii and Tridax procumbens. Feeding activity is intense during the months of July, August, September and October with flowering seasons of many plants. However, they show stable activity in year around.

It is an economically important species due to the ability to biosynthesize potent defensive blistering agent cantharidin.
