= Itagonia cordiformis =

Scientific classification
- Domain: Eukaryota
- Kingdom: Animalia
- Phylum: Arthropoda
- Class: Insecta
- Order: Coleoptera
- Suborder: Polyphaga
- Infraorder: Cucujiformia
- Family: Tenebrionidae
- Genus: Itagonia
- Species: I. cordiformis

Binomial name
- Itagonia cordiformis Shi & Ren, 2007

Species of beetle

Itagonia cordiformis is a species of beetle, endemic to Tibet, China. It was first described in 2007.
