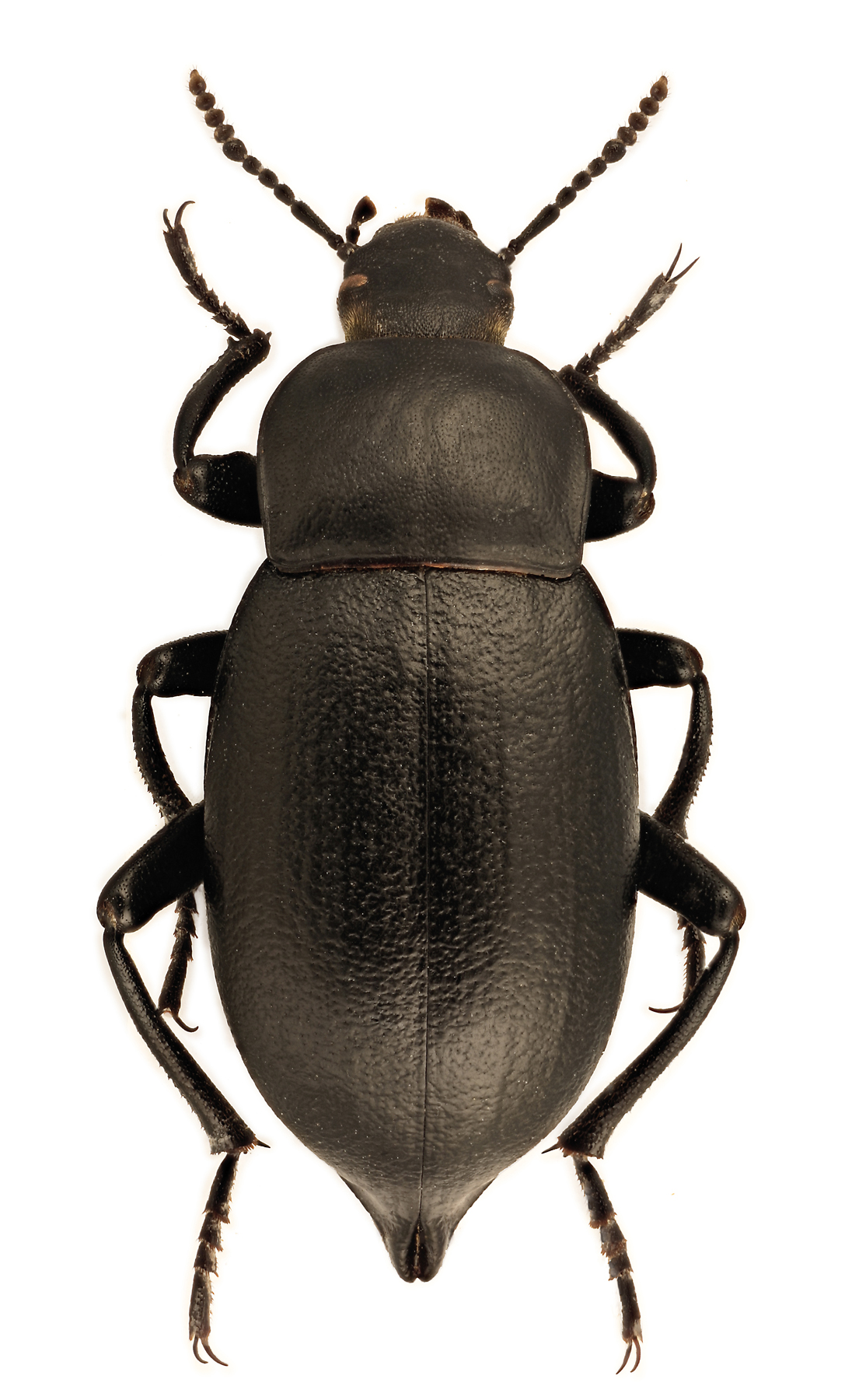
- Blaps lethifera

Scientific classification
- Domain: Eukaryota
- Kingdom: Animalia
- Phylum: Arthropoda
- Class: Insecta
- Order: Coleoptera
- Suborder: Polyphaga
- Infraorder: Cucujiformia
- Family: Tenebrionidae
- Genus: Blaps
- Species: B. lethifera

Binomial name
- Blaps lethifera Marsham, 1802

= Blaps lethifera =

Species of beetle

Blaps lethifera is a species of beetle in the family Tenebrionidae. The species is native to the Palaearctic and considered invasive in the UK, Finland, and Sweden.

== Identification ==
Blaps lethifera is difficult to identify, as individual characters can look quite different from one another and it is challenging to differentiate them from similar species based on only one feature. No single trait is reliable for identification. Females are considered impossible to identify with certainty, however roughly 98% of males can be accurately identified based on the shape of part of the specimen's leg (the ventroapical projection of protarsomere 5) and its reproductive structure (the aedeagus). In some cases, the specimens may resemble a mix of different species, which adds to the challenge of identification.
