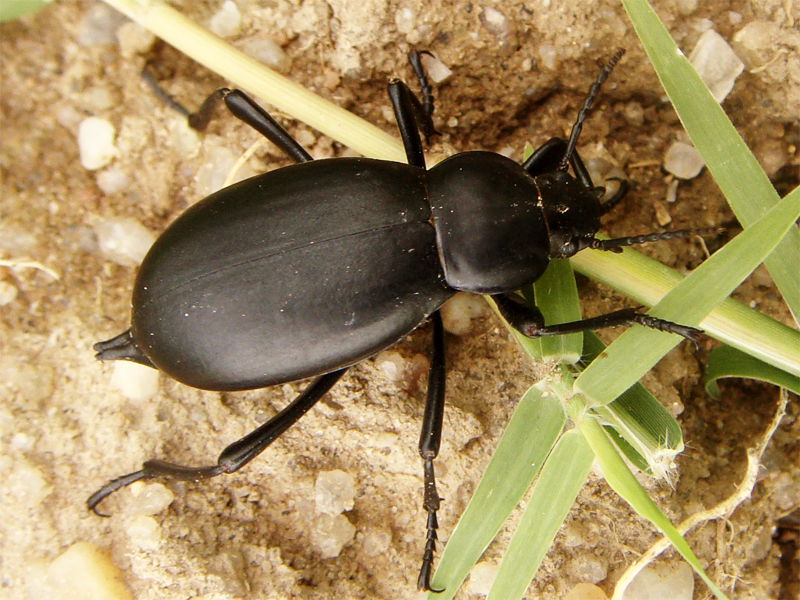
- Blaps lusitanica, Portugal

Scientific classification
- Kingdom: Animalia
- Phylum: Arthropoda
- Class: Insecta
- Order: Coleoptera
- Suborder: Polyphaga
- Infraorder: Cucujiformia
- Family: Tenebrionidae
- Subfamily: Blaptinae
- Tribe: Blaptini; Leach, 1815

Subtribes
- Blaptina Leach, 1815; Gnaptorina G.S. Medvedev, 2001; Gnaptorinina G.S. Medvedev, 2001; Prosodina Skopin, 1960; Remipedellina Semenov, 1907

= Blaptini =

Tribe of darkling beetles

Blaptini is a tribe of darkling beetles in the family Tenebrionidae. There are more than 30 genera recognized in the tribe Blaptini.

In research by Kamiński et al. published in 2021, Blaptini and six other tribes were moved from Tenebrioninae into the newly resurrected subfamily Blaptinae. These tribes contained 281 genera and about 4000 species, about 50% of Tenebrioninae. The new classification was followed by Bouchard et al. the same year.

== Genera ==
These genera belong to the tribe Blaptini:

- Ablapsis Reitter, 1887 (the Palearctic)
- Agnaptoria Reitter, 1887 (the Palearctic)
- Asidoblaps Fairmaire, 1886 (the Palearctic and Indomalaya)
- Belousovia G.S. Medvedev, 2007 (the Palearctic)
- Blaps Fabricius, 1775 (North America, tropical Africa, Indomalaya, Australasia, and Oceania)
- Blaptogonia G.S. Medvedev, 1998 (the Palearctic and Indomalaya)
- Caraboblaps Bauer, 1921*
- Coelocnemodes Bates, 1879 (Indomalaya)
- Colasia Koch, 1965 (the Palearctic)
- Dila Fischer von Waldheim, 1844 (the Palearctic)
- Dilablaps Bogatchev, 1976 (the Palearctic)
- Gnaptor Brullé, 1831 (the Palearctic)
- Gnaptorina Reitter, 1887 (the Palearctic and Indomalaya)
- Holoblaps Bauer, 1921*
- Hoplitoblaps Fairmaire, 1889 (Indomalaya)
- Itagonia Reitter, 1887 (the Palearctic)
- Medvedevia Chigray, 2019 (the Palearctic)
- Medvedevoblaps Bouchard & Bousquet, 2021 (the Palearctic)
- Montagona G.S. Medvedev, 1998 (the Palearctic and Indomalaya)
- Nalepa Reitter, 1887 (the Palearctic)
- Nepalindia G.S. Medvedev, 1998 (Indomalaya)
- Periblaps Bauer, 1921*
- Prosodes Eschscholtz, 1829 (the Palearctic and Indomalaya)
- Protoblaps Bauer, 1921*
- Pseudognaptorina Kaszab, 1977 (the Palearctic and Indomalaya)
- Remipedella Semenov, 1907 (the Palearctic)
- Sintagona G.S. Medvedev, 1998 (the Palearctic)
- Tagona Fischer von Waldheim, 1820 (the Palearctic)
- Tagonoides Fairmaire, 1886 (the Palearctic)
- Thaioblaps Masumoto, 1989 (Indomalaya)
- Thaumatoblaps Kaszab & G.S. Medvedev, 1984 (the Palearctic)
- Viettagona G.S. Medvedev & Merkl, 2003 (Indomalaya)
