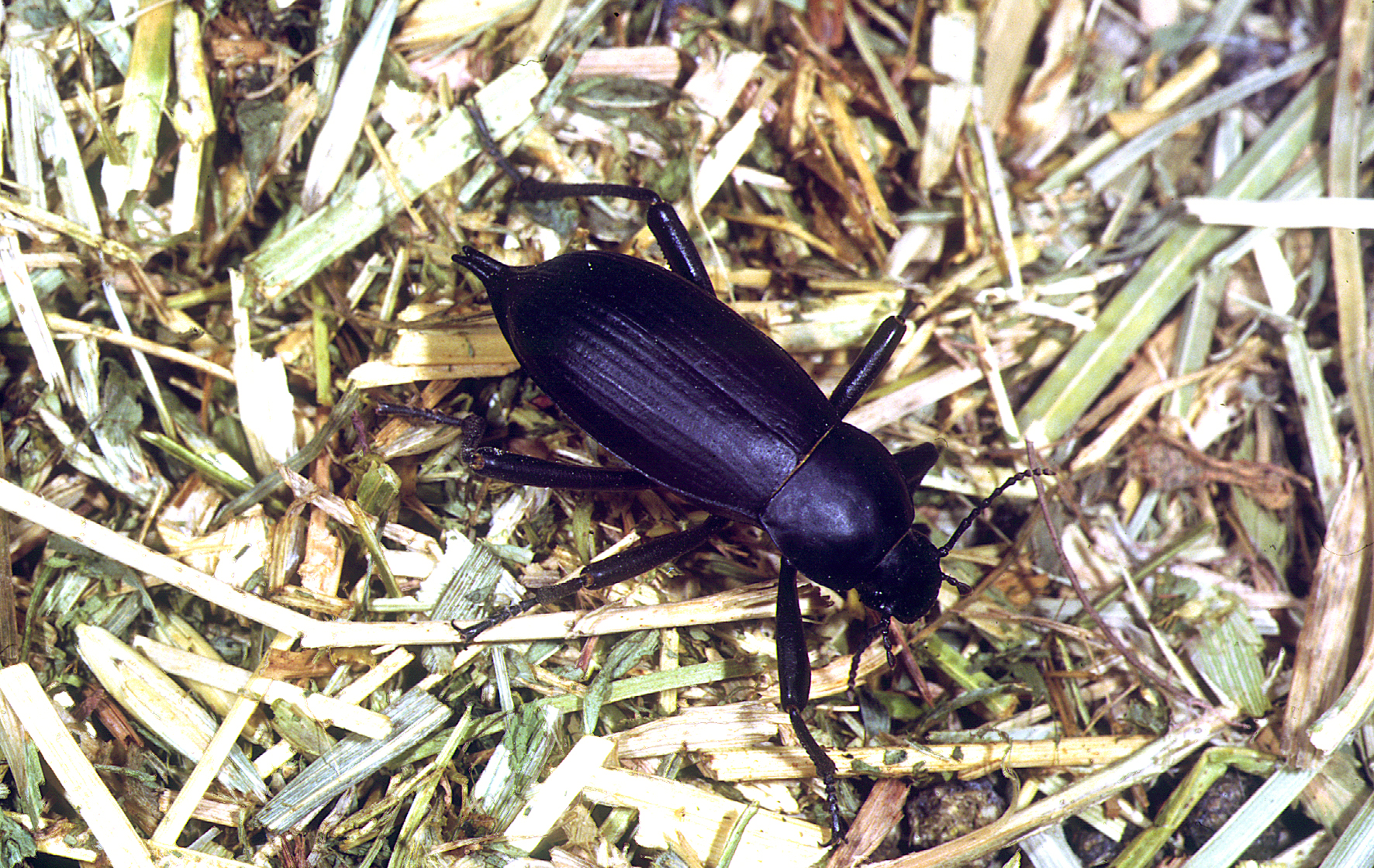
- Blaps polychresta in Queensland, Australia

Scientific classification
- Kingdom: Animalia
- Phylum: Arthropoda
- Class: Insecta
- Order: Coleoptera
- Suborder: Polyphaga
- Infraorder: Cucujiformia
- Family: Tenebrionidae
- Genus: Blaps
- Species: B. polychresta

Binomial name
- Blaps polychresta (Forskål, 1775)

= Blaps polychresta =

Egyptian Beetle

Blaps polychresta, commonly known as the Egyptian beetle, South African beetle or cellar beetle, is a species of beetle in the family Tenebrionidae. This species is a popular pet and can live up to 4-5 years. Although this species is introduced to Australia and America, it is not considered a pest, and is rather commonly found in chicken coops where the chickens feast on this species.

== Taxonomy ==
Blaps polychresta has one junior synonym, Blaps sulcata. (Fabricius, 1775, not to be confused with Laporte de Castelnau, 1980)

== Distribution ==
The species is found naturally across from Syria to Egypt, but has also been introduced to Australia, particularly Southern Australia and Western Victoria via European Clipper ships carrying grain, and to Northern America.

== Diet and ecology ==
This species is a herbivore, feeding on residue and organic waste of animals such as rodents and birds. Cystocephalus algerianus infects the males with a rate of 1 in 105 specimens.
