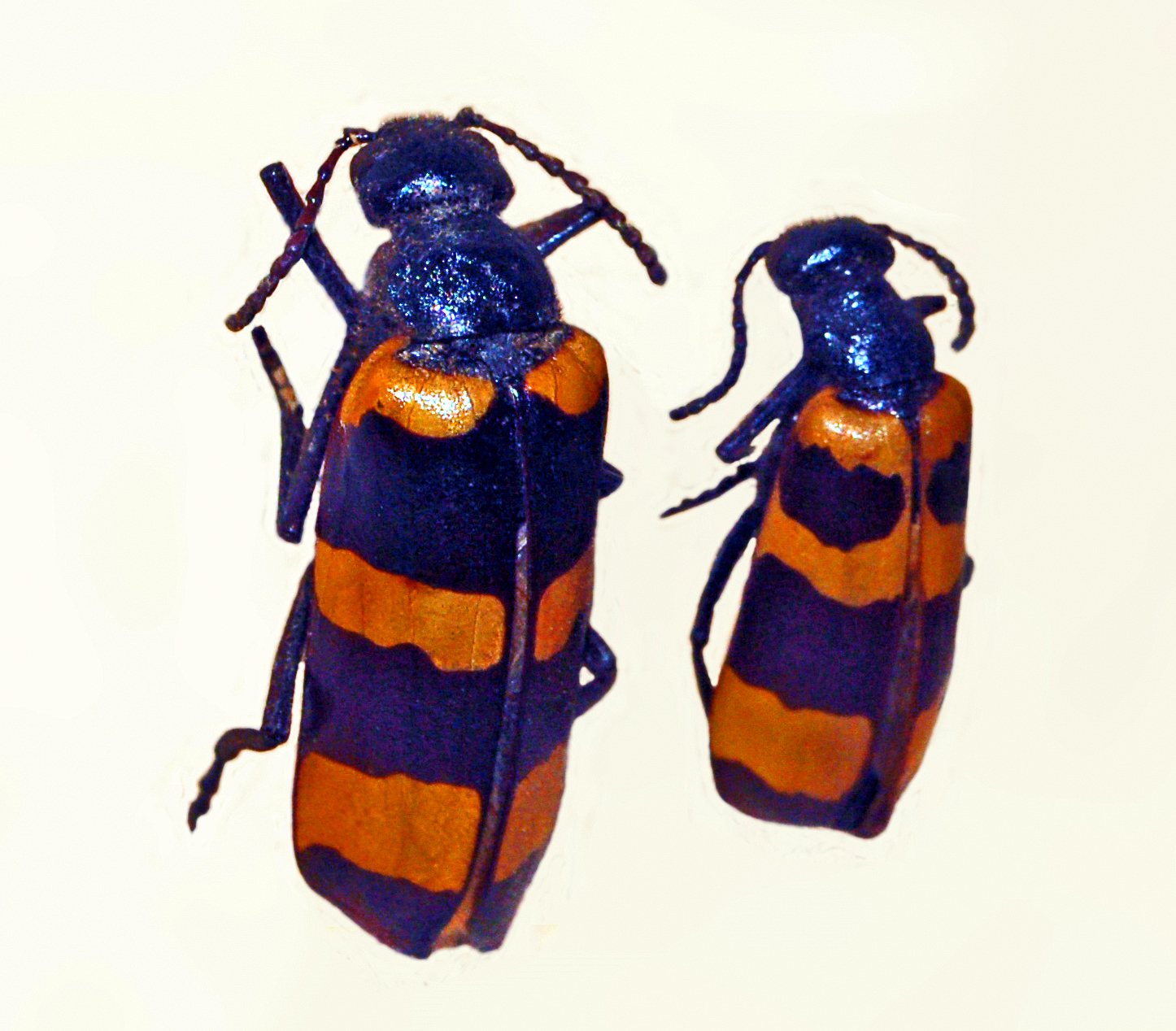
- Mylabris oleae from Tunisia

Scientific classification
- Domain: Eukaryota
- Kingdom: Animalia
- Phylum: Arthropoda
- Class: Insecta
- Order: Coleoptera
- Suborder: Polyphaga
- Infraorder: Cucujiformia
- Family: Meloidae
- Genus: Mylabris
- Species: M. oleae

Binomial name
- Mylabris oleae Laporte de Castelnau, 1840

= Mylabris oleae =

Species of beetle

Mylabris oleae is a species of beetle belonging to the Meloidae family.

== Distribution ==
This species occurs in North Africa.
