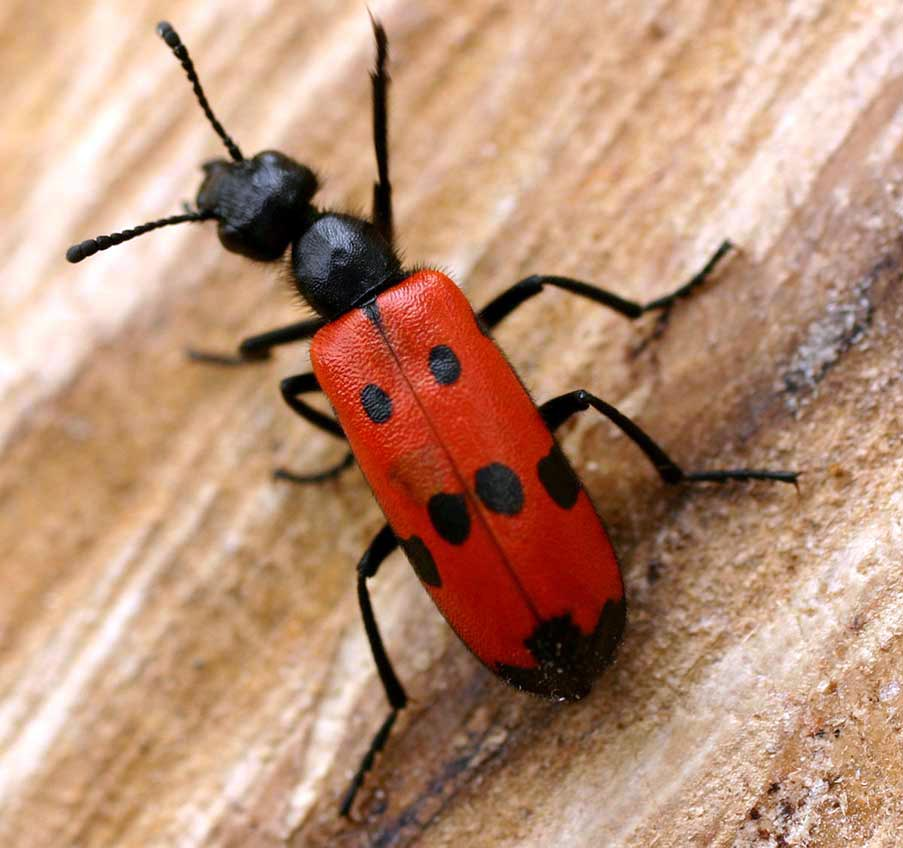
- M. quadripunctata

Scientific classification
- Domain: Eukaryota
- Kingdom: Animalia
- Phylum: Arthropoda
- Class: Insecta
- Order: Coleoptera
- Suborder: Polyphaga
- Infraorder: Cucujiformia
- Family: Meloidae
- Subfamily: Meloinae
- Tribe: Mylabrini
- Genus: Mylabris; Fabricius, 1775

Species
- See text

= Mylabris =

Genus of beetles

Mylabris is a genus of beetles in the family Meloidae. It is endemic to the Palearctic realm. The species-rich genus Hycleus (c. 430 spp.) was historically confused with Mylabris and have their greatest diversity in the Afrotropics.

== Species ==
- Mylabris abdelkaderi (Escalera, 1909)
- Mylabris afghanica Kaszab, 1953
- Mylabris ajantaensis Saha, 1979
- Mylabris alicae Pic, 1909
- Mylabris allousei (Kaszab, 1960)
- Mylabris alpina Ménétriés, 1832
- Mylabris alterna Laporte de Castelnau, 1840
- Mylabris alternata Harold, 1870
- Mylabris amoenula Ménétriés, 1849
- Mylabris amori Graells, 1858
- Mylabris andongoana Harold, 1879
- Mylabris andrei Pic, 1911
- Mylabris andresi (Pic, 1911)
- Mylabris angustissima Pic, 1909
- Mylabris aperta Gerstaecker, 1873
- Mylabris apicefasciata Sumakov, 1929
- Mylabris apicenigra Sumakov, 1915
- Mylabris arctefasciata Pic, 1907
- Mylabris argyrosticta Fairmaire in Révoil, 1882
- Mylabris atricornis Linell, 1896
- Mylabris atrofasciata (Pic, 1921)
- Mylabris audouini Marseul, 1870
- Mylabris aulica Ménétriés, 1832
- Mylabris aurociliata (Escherich, 1899)
- Mylabris axillaris Billberg, 1813
- Mylabris basibicincta Marseul, 1872
- Mylabris batesi Marseul, 1872
- Mylabris batnensis Marseul, 1870
- Mylabris baulnyi Marseul, 1870
- Mylabris beckeri Escherich, 1890
- Mylabris behanzini Pic, 1913
- Mylabris bella Marseul, 1872
- Mylabris bicincta Marseul, 1872
- Mylabris bifasciata (De Geer, 1778)
- Mylabris bifucata Marseul, 1879
- Mylabris bihumerosa Marseul, 1872
- Mylabris bisseptemmaculata Pic, 1909
- Mylabris bissexguttata Marseul, 1879
- Mylabris bistillata Tan, 1981
- Mylabris bivulnera (Pallas, 1781)
- Mylabris boghariensis Raffray, 1873
- Mylabris breveapicalis (Pic, 1919)
- Mylabris brevicornis Motschulsky, 1872
- Mylabris bululuensis Pic, 1914
- Mylabris buqueti Marseul, 1872
- Mylabris burmeisteri Bertoloni, 1850
- Mylabris calida (Pallas, 1782)
- Mylabris carinifrons Marseul, 1879
- Mylabris carneofasciata Pic, 1913
- Mylabris caroli (Pic, 1899)
- Mylabris chariensis Pic, 1913
- Mylabris chisambensis Wellman, 1909
- Mylabris chudeaui (Bedel, 1921)
- Mylabris ciliciensis (Escherich, 1899)
- Mylabris cincta A. G. Olivier, 1811
- Mylabris cinctoides Kaszab, 1957
- Mylabris coecus (Thunberg, 1791)
- Mylabris coeruleomaculata L. Redtenbacher, 1843
- Mylabris coerulescens Gebler, 1841
- Mylabris concolor Marseul, 1870
- Mylabris connata (Rey, 1892)
- Mylabris convexior Pic, 1909
- Mylabris coryniformis Pic, 1913
- Mylabris crocata (Pallas, 1781)
- Mylabris crux (Escherich, 1899)
- Mylabris cyaneovaria (Reitter, 1889)
- Mylabris damascena Reiche, 1866
- Mylabris dashidorzsi Kaszab, 1964
- Mylabris deferreri Ruiz & García-París, 2004
- Mylabris dejeani Gyllenhaal, 1817
- Mylabris delagrangei (Pic, 1899)
- Mylabris delhiensis Anand, 1984
- Mylabris derosa Péringuey, 1909
- Mylabris dilloni Guérin-Méneville, 1849
- Mylabris discorufescens Pic, 1913
- Mylabris discrepens Marseul, 1879
- Mylabris dispar Marseul, 1872
- Mylabris distincta Thomas, 1899
- Mylabris djebelina (Pic, 1902)
- Mylabris dohrni Marseul, 1872
- Mylabris dokhtouroffi (Escherich, 1899)
- Mylabris doriai Marseul, 1870
- Mylabris dumolini Laporte de Castelnau, 1840
- Mylabris duodecimguttata Erichson, 1843
- Mylabris elegans A. G. Olivier, 1811
- Mylabris elegantissima Zoubkoff, 1837
- Mylabris elongata Herbst, 1784
- Mylabris emiliae (Escherich, 1899)
- Mylabris entebbensis Pic, 1914
- Mylabris ertii Voigts, 1903
- Mylabris escherichi Voigts, 1901
- Mylabris excisofasciata (Heyden, 1883)
- Mylabris externepunctata Faldermann, 1832
- Mylabris fabricii Sumakov, 1924
- Mylabris fenestrata (Escherich, 1899)
- Mylabris festiva (Pallas, 1773)
- Mylabris fiesi Voigts, 1901
- Mylabris filicornis Marseul, 1870
- Mylabris flavicornis (Fabricius, 1801)
- Mylabris flavipennis Motschulsky, 1872
- Mylabris flavoguttata Reiche in Ferret & Galin, 1850
- Mylabris flexuosa A. G. Olivier, 1811
- Mylabris florianii Pic, 1909
- Mylabris formosa Wellman, 1910
- Mylabris foveithorax Pic, 1912
- Mylabris frolovi Fischer von Waldheim, 1823
- Mylabris fuliginosa (Olivier, 1811)
- Mylabris funeraria Gestro, 1895
- Mylabris furcimacula Sumakov, 1915
- Mylabris gamicola Marseul, 1872
- Mylabris gebleri Faldermann, 1837
- Mylabris geminata Fabricius, 1798
- Mylabris gemmula Dohrn, 1873
- Mylabris ghazniana Kaszab, 1973
- Mylabris goaensis Saha, 1979
- Mylabris gonoctylus Saha, 1972
- Mylabris groschkei Kaszab, 1957
- Mylabris guerini Chevrolat, 1840
- Mylabris guptai Anand, 1984
- Mylabris hauseri (Escherich, 1899)
- Mylabris hemprichi Klug, 1845
- Mylabris hieracii Graells, 1849
- Mylabris hilaris Péringuey, 1892
- Mylabris himalayaensis Saha, 1979
- Mylabris hirta Tan, 1992
- Mylabris hirtipennis Raffray, 1873
- Mylabris hollebekei Pic, 1909
- Mylabris holosericea Klug, 1835
- Mylabris horai Saha, 1972
- Mylabris humeralis Walker, 1858
- Mylabris hybrida Marseul, 1872
- Mylabris impedita (Heyden, 1883)
- Mylabris impressa Chevrolat, 1840
- Mylabris inculta (Escherich, 1899)
- Mylabris intermedia Fischer von Waldheim, 1844
- Mylabris interrupta A. G. Olivier, 1801
- Mylabris irrorata (Lichtenstenstein, 1795)
- Mylabris isis Marseul, 1876
- Mylabris jacob Marseul, 1879
- Mylabris kambovensis Pic, 1909
- Mylabris kapuri Saha, 1972
- Mylabris karacaevica (Roubal, 1914)
- Mylabris karakalensis Kryzhanovskij, 1956
- Mylabris klapperichi Kaszab, 1958
- Mylabris klugi L. Redtenbacher, 1850
- Mylabris kodymi Maran, 1944
- Mylabris koenigi (Dokhtouroff, 1889)
- Mylabris kraatzi (Heyden, 1881)
- Mylabris kuzini Kryzhanovskij, 1956
- Mylabris lactimala Marseul, 1879
- Mylabris laevicollis Marseul, 1870
- Mylabris lanigera Marseul, 1879
- Mylabris lateplagiata Fairmaire, 1887
- Mylabris laticollis (Escherich, 1899)
- Mylabris lavaterae (Fabricius, 1801)
- Mylabris ledebouri Gebler, 1829
- Mylabris lemoulti Pic, 1913
- Mylabris liliputana (Escherich, 1899)
- Mylabris liquida Erichson, 1843
- Mylabris longipilis (Pic, 1897)
- Mylabris lucens Escherich, 1904
- Mylabris maceki (Dvorák, 1985)
- Mylabris macilenta Marseul, 1873
- Mylabris maculicornis Voigts, 1903
- Mylabris maculosa Klug, 1835
- Mylabris maculosopunctata Graells, 1858
- Mylabris madani (Escalera, 1909)
- Mylabris madoni Marseul, 1883
- Mylabris magnoguttata (Heyden, 1881)
- Mylabris mandibularis Saha, 1979
- Mylabris mannerheimii Gebler, 1844
- Mylabris manophorus (Lichtenstein, 1795)
- Mylabris manorensis Pic, 1909
- Mylabris manowensis Pic, 1910
- Mylabris marakensis Kaszab, 1953
- Mylabris marginata Fischer von Waldheim, 1844
- Mylabris marschalli Borchmann, 1911
- Mylabris matabele Péringuey, 1909
- Mylabris mateui Pardo Alcaide, 1954
- Mylabris matoppoena Péringuey, 1909
- Mylabris mimosae A. G. Olivier, 1811
- Mylabris mirzayani (Kaszab, 1968)
- Mylabris mocquerysi Pic, 1911
- Mylabris modesta (Escherich, 1899)
- Mylabris mongolica (Dokhtouroff, 1887)
- Mylabris monozona Wellman, 1910
- Mylabris muata Harold, 1878
- Mylabris munda (Escherich, 1897)
- Mylabris myrmidon Marseul, 1870
- Mylabris nathi Saha, 1979
- Mylabris neavei Pic, 1909
- Mylabris neglecta (Escherich, 1899)
- Mylabris nevadensis (Escalera, 1915)
- Mylabris nigricaudus (Olivier, 1811)
- Mylabris novemdecimpunctata Olivier
- Mylabris nuristanica Kaszab, 1958
- Mylabris obsoleta Novicki, 1872
- Mylabris ocellata (Pallas, 1773)
- Mylabris oleae Chevrolat, 1840
- Mylabris olivieri Billberg, 1813
- Mylabris omocrates Wellman, 1910
- Mylabris ongueriana Kaszab, 1981
- Mylabris opacula Marseul, 1879
- Mylabris orientalis Marseul, 1872
- Mylabris paliji Kotschenov, 1970
- Mylabris pallasi Gebler, 1829
- Mylabris palliata Marseul, 1872
- Mylabris pallipes (Olivier, 1811)
- Mylabris pannonica Kaszab, 1956
- Mylabris pardoi Saha, 1972
- Mylabris parumpicta (Heyden, 1883)
- Mylabris paulinoi Marseul, 1879
- Mylabris pauper (Escherich, 1899)
- Mylabris pentheri Ganglbauer, 1905
- Mylabris pertinax Péringuey, 1909
- Mylabris phelopsis Marseul, 1879
- Mylabris picteti Marseul, 1872
- Mylabris pilifera Marseul, 1872
- Mylabris plagiata (Pallas, 1782)
- Mylabris platai Pardo Alcaide, 1975
- Mylabris plurivulnera Dohrn, 1873
- Mylabris pluvialis Wellman, 1910
- Mylabris posticalis (Dokhtouroff, 1889)
- Mylabris postsexmaculata Pic, 1913
- Mylabris postunifasciata Pic, 1913
- Mylabris praestans Gerstaecker, 1871
- Mylabris pruinosa Gerstaecker, 1854
- Mylabris pubescens Klug, 1835
- Mylabris pulchella Faldermann, 1833
- Mylabris pulchra Kaszab, 1973
- Mylabris pusilla A. G. Olivier, 1811
- Mylabris quadripunctata (Linnaeus, 1767)
- Mylabris quadrisignata Fischer von Waldheim, 1823
- Mylabris quatuordecimmaculata Dokhtouroff, 1889
- Mylabris quinquemaculata Okamoto, 1924
- Mylabris quinqueplagiata Kaszab, 1958
- Mylabris raja Marseul, 1872
- Mylabris rajasthanicus Saha, 1972
- Mylabris raml W. Schneider, 1991
- Mylabris recognita Walker, 1859
- Mylabris rimosa Marseul, 1870
- Mylabris rorifera Gestro, 1895
- Mylabris rufitarsis Marseul, 1879
- Mylabris rufonotata Pic, 1909
- Mylabris rutilicollis Fairmaire, 1893
- Mylabris rutilipupes Marseul, 1872
- Mylabris sairamensis Ballion, 1878
- Mylabris salaamensis Pic, 1913
- Mylabris sanghana Pic, 1909
- Mylabris sanguinosa Marseul, 1872
- Mylabris scalaris Marseul, 1872
- Mylabris schreibersi Reiche, 1866
- Mylabris schrenki Gebler, 1841
- Mylabris sculptilis Kaszab, 1958
- Mylabris sedecimguttata (Thunberg, 1791)
- Mylabris sedecimpunctata Gebler, 1825
- Mylabris sedilethorax Sumakov, 1929
- Mylabris semilutea Pic, 1910
- Mylabris seminigra Voigts, 1901
- Mylabris semivittata (Pic, 1947)
- Mylabris sennae Gestro, 1895
- Mylabris serena (Escherich, 1899)
- Mylabris severini Pic, 1909
- Mylabris sexnotata L. Redtenbacher, 1843
- Mylabris sibirica Fischer von Waldheim, 1823
- Mylabris sibutensis Pic, 1913
- Mylabris sibylae Wellman, 1910
- Mylabris sinuata Klug, 1845
- Mylabris sisymbrii Klug, 1845
- Mylabris smaragdina Gebler, 1841
- Mylabris sobrina Graells, 1851
- Mylabris solanensis Saha, 1979
- Mylabris somalica Thomas, 1900
- Mylabris speciosa (Pallas, 1781)
- Mylabris splendidula (Pallas, 1781)
- Mylabris steppensis (Dokhtouroff, 1889)
- Mylabris subbrevicornis Kaszab, 1958
- Mylabris subelongata Pic, 1910
- Mylabris submetallica Pic, 1909
- Mylabris submetalliceps Pic, 1913
- Mylabris suturalis (Pic, 1898)
- Mylabris svacopina Marseul, 1872
- Mylabris syriaca Klug, 1845
- Mylabris tarbagataiensis (Pic, 1919)
- Mylabris tauricola Marseul, 1870
- Mylabris tenebrosa Laporte de Castelnau, 1840
- Mylabris testaceilabris Pic, 1913
- Mylabris testudo Marseul, 1872
- Mylabris tettensis Gerstaecker, 1854
- Mylabris thamii Kocher, 1963
- Mylabris theryi (Abeille de Perrin, 1894)
- Mylabris thunbergi (Billberg, 1813)
- Mylabris tibialis Marseul, 1872
- Mylabris tiflensis Billberg, 1813
- Mylabris tillensis (Billberg, 1813)
- Mylabris tindila Wellman, 1910
- Mylabris tomentosa (Escherich, 1899)
- Mylabris tricincta Chevrolat, 1840
- Mylabris trifasciata (Thunberg, 1791)
- Mylabris trifascis (Pallas, 1773)
- Mylabris trifolia Marseul, 1872
- Mylabris trigonalis (Lichtenstein, 1795)
- Mylabris tripartita Gerstaecker, 1854
- Mylabris tristigma Gerstaecker, 1854
- Mylabris tristriguttata Marseul, 1879
- Mylabris trivittis (Pallas, 1782)
- Mylabris turkestanica (Dokhtouroff, 1889)
- Mylabris uhagoni Martinez y Sáez, 1873
- Mylabris undecimnotata (Heyden, 1883)
- Mylabris undecimpunctata Fischer von Waldheim, 1842
- Mylabris unicincta Linell, 1869
- Mylabris unicolor Faldermann, 1837
- Mylabris variabilis (Pallas, 1781)
- Mylabris varians Gyllenhaal, 1817
- Mylabris versuta Péringuey, 1909
- Mylabris vestita Reiche in Ferret & Galin, 1849
- Mylabris vicinalis Marseul, 1872
- Mylabris viridescens Pic, 1908
- Mylabris viridimetallica Pic, 1913
- Mylabris waziristanica (Kaszab, 1958)
- Mylabris zoltankaszabi Ruiz & García-París, 2007
