= Vasily Zubkov =

Russian entomologist

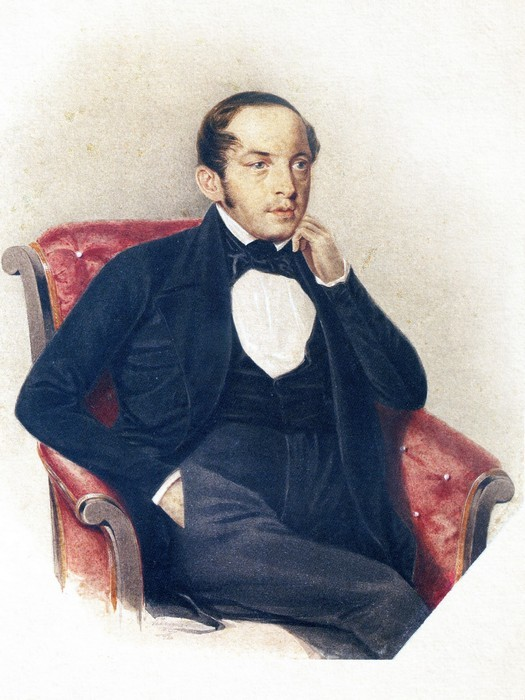

Vasily Petrovich Zubkov French form B. Zoubkoff (25 June 1799 – 24 April 1862) was a Russian naturalist and a close friend of the poet Alexander Pushkin. He pioneered epidemiology when he examined an outbreak of cholera in Moscow and noted that the cholera cases were clustered near a low flood plain area near a canal. An early member of the Moscow society of naturalists, he described a number of beetle species from Russia.

== Life and work ==
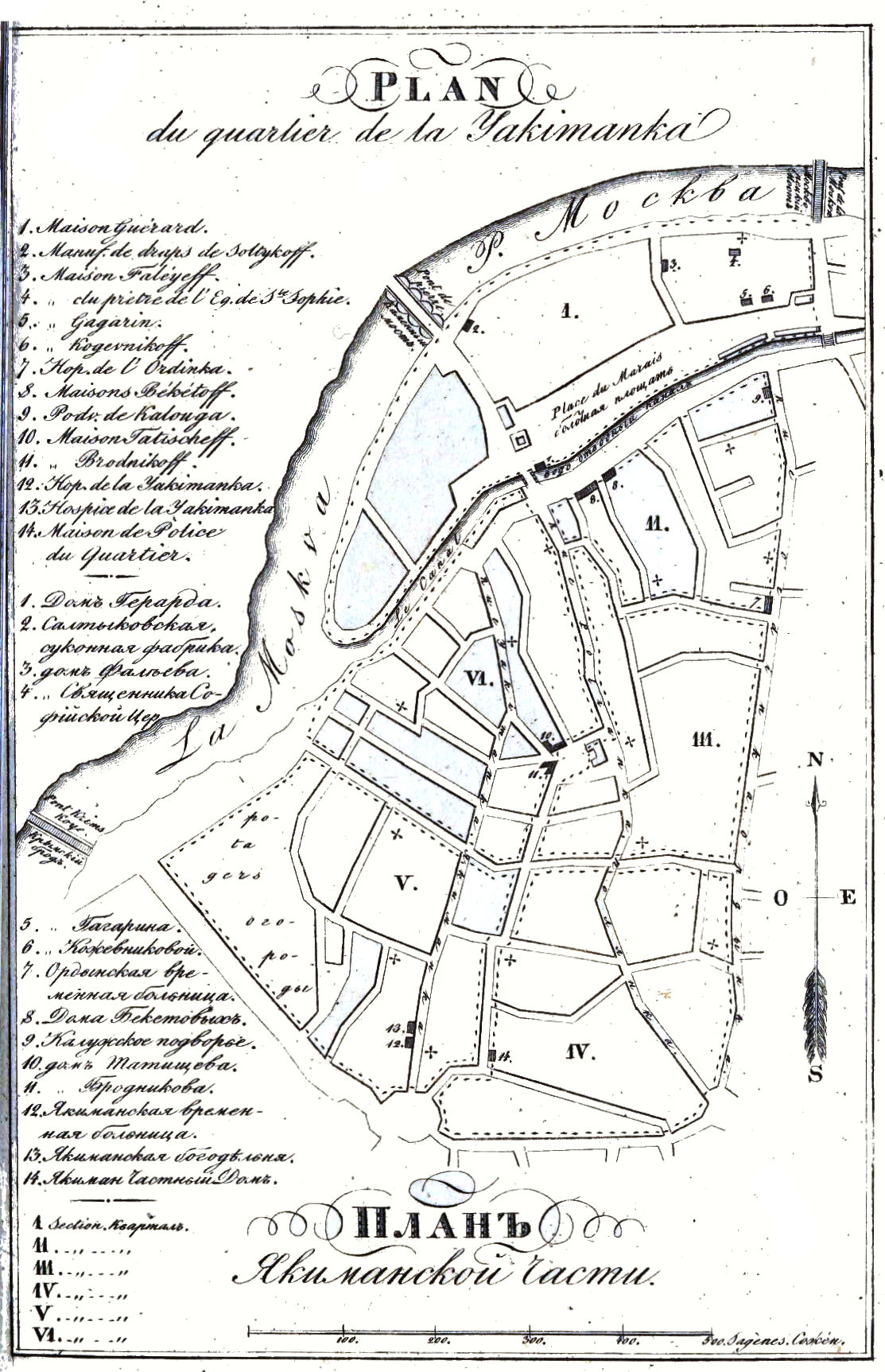
Cholera map, 1831

Zubkov was born in Moscow, the son of military officer Pyotr Abramovich and his second wife Natalya Petrovna Evreinova (1775-1845). Losing his father early, he grew up under the care of his mother and maternal uncle Dmitry Evereinov and a paternal uncle Ivan Bulgakov. Zubkov became a student in the architectural school at a young age and was titled as a clear in 1809 in the Moscow Kremlin Construction. He resigned in 1815 and joined Moscow Educational Institution. In 1817 he became ensign for the royal quartermaster department. He became a second lieutenant in 1819 and left service shortly after and travelled abroad. In 1821 he was in Paris where he was an admirer of the French legal system and after returning to St. Petersburg, he joined the Masonic Lodge "United Slavs" but left in 1822 as the government ordered the closure of such associations. In 1820 he became acquainted with Sergei Nikolaevich Kashkin and his cousin Prince Yevgeny Obolensky. His circle extended with Ivan Ivanovich Pushchin who belonged to the high society of Moscow. He became a member of the Collegium of Foreign Affairs in 1821. In 1825 he formed what he called a "brotherhood of the seven-pointed star" with several of his friends and this led to his being considered a member of a secret society. In 1826 he was arrested and investigated for association with the Decembrists. A testimony from Prince Obolensky led to his being released. In 1823 he married Anna Feodorovna Pushkina, daughter of Feodor Alekseevich Pushkin. On the advice of D. V. Golitsyn he became an advisor to the Moscow Chamber of the Criminal Court. In 1838 he became deputy chairman. In 1824 he became active in the Moscow Society of Agriculture and was also elected as full member of the Imperial Moscow Society of Naturalists. He became a director of the Yaroslav Demidov Lyceum in 1838. In 1845 he became chief prosecutor in the criminal department and later in the Senate. In 1855 he became a privy councilor but poor health forced him to resign. He died in Moscow and was buried in Donskoy Monastery.

Zubkov was a member of the society of Moscow naturalists and he described a number of beetle species from Russian collections (many made by Grigory Karelin) under the French spelling "B. Zoubkoff". A beetle Lixus zoubkoffii was named after him by Boheman. In 1831 he examined an outbreak of cholera in Moscow he worked in the cholera committee and worked at the yakiman Hospital. In a book on the outbreak he was able to document that most cases as being in a low flood plain of a river.
