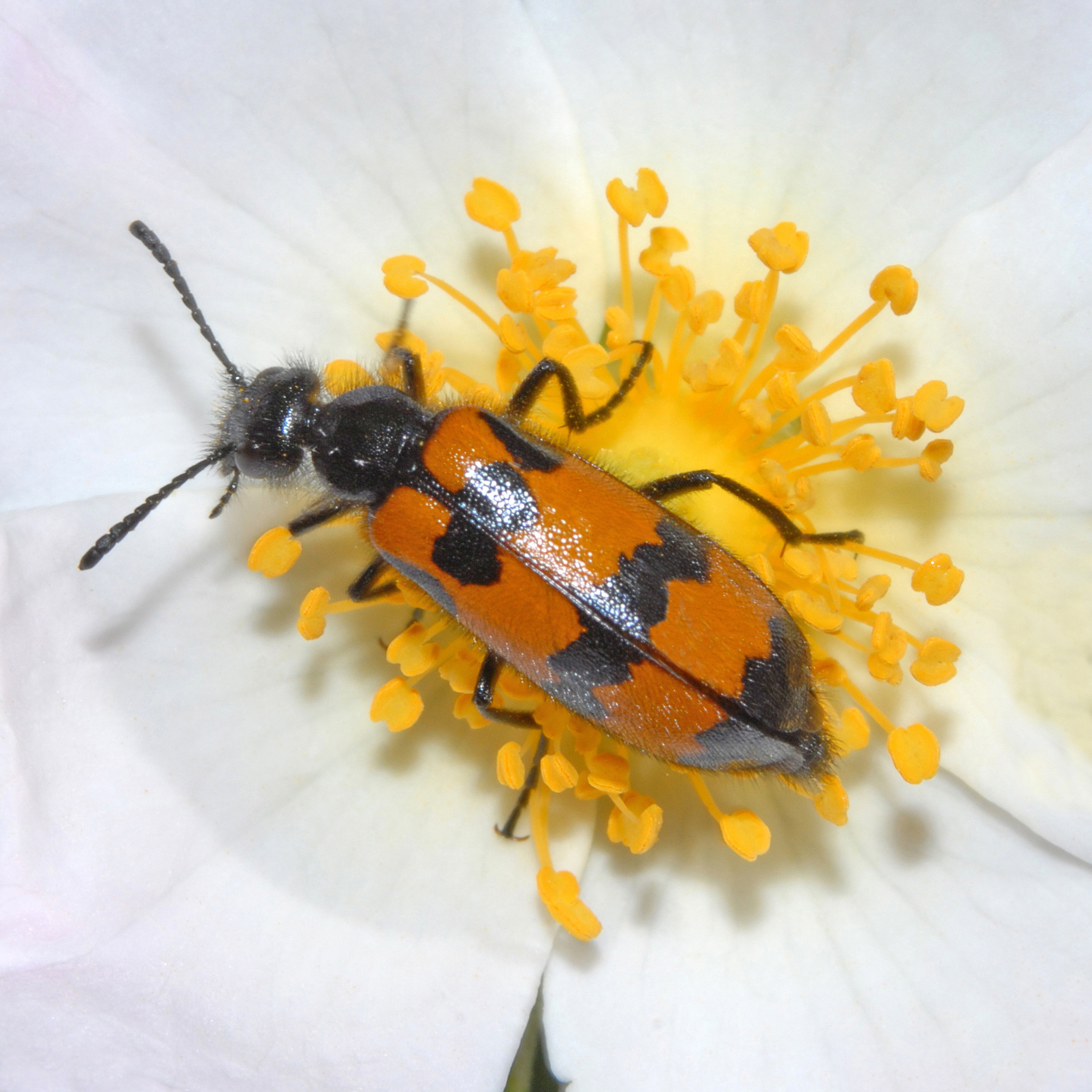
- Mylabris variabilis. Dorsal view

Scientific classification
- Kingdom: Animalia
- Phylum: Arthropoda
- Clade: Pancrustacea
- Class: Insecta
- Order: Coleoptera
- Suborder: Polyphaga
- Infraorder: Cucujiformia
- Family: Meloidae
- Genus: Mylabris
- Species: M. variabilis

Binomial name
- Mylabris variabilis (Pallas, 1782)

Synonyms
- Meloe cichorii Linnaeus, 1767; Mylabris hypocrita Mulsant, 1857; Mylabris mutans Guérin de Méneville, 1834; Mylabris similaris Mulsant, 1857; Zonabris erivanica Pic, 1901

= Mylabris variabilis =

Species of beetle

Mylabris variabilis is a species of blister beetle belonging to the Meloidae family.

== Subspecies ==
- Mylabris variabilis var. disrupta Baudi, 1878
- Mylabris variabilis var. lacera Fischer von Waldheim, 1827
- Mylabris variabilis var. mutabilis Mars
- Mylabris variabilis var. sturmi Baudi

== Distribution ==
This common species is present in most of Southern Europe, from the Iberian Peninsula to southern Russia. It can also be found in Caucaus and Transcaucasia, Near East and northern Levant, Middle East and Central Asia and Siberia.

== Description ==
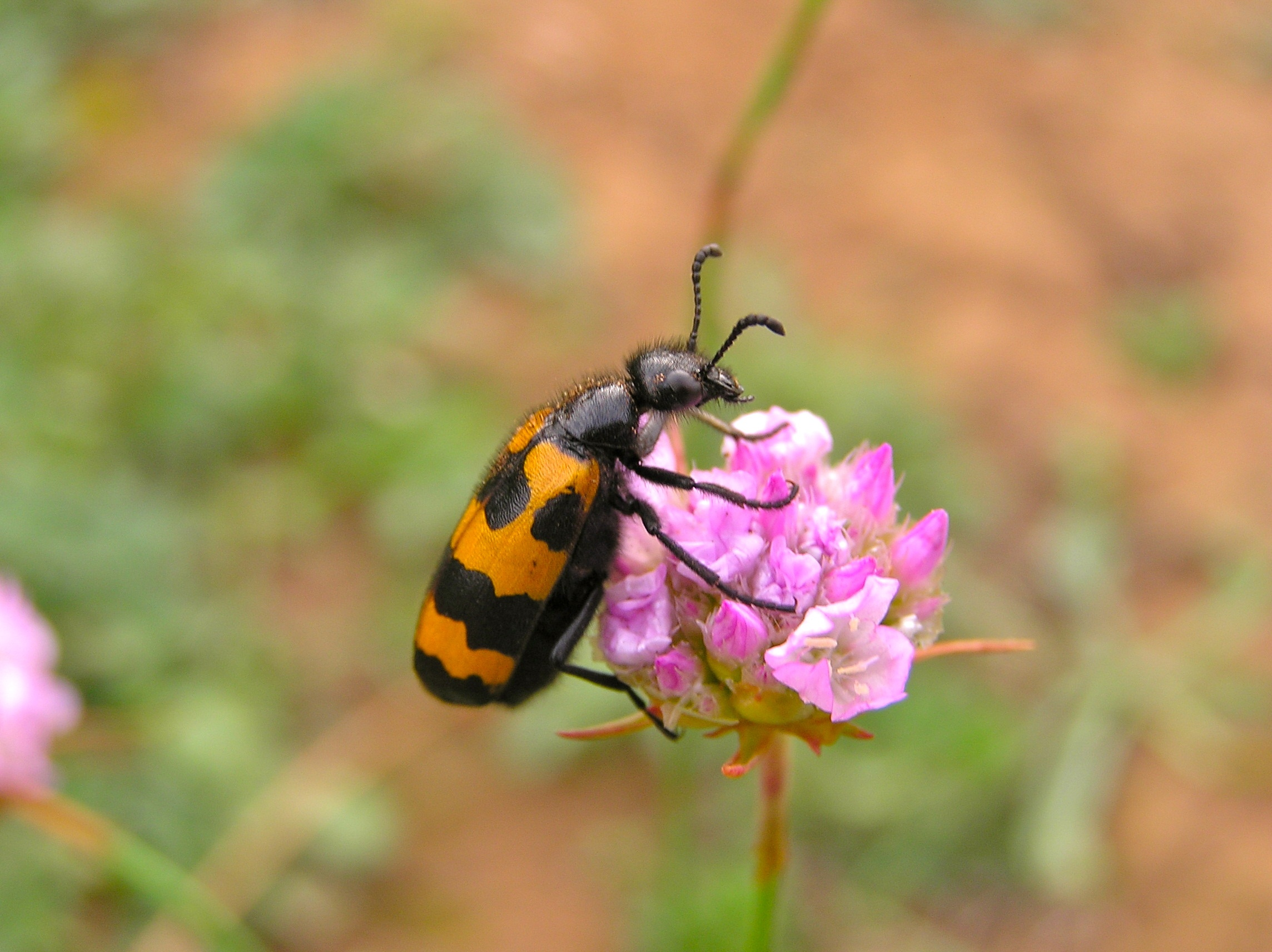
Side view

Mylabris variabilis can reach a body length of 8–20 millimetres (0.31–0.79 in). These beetles have a cylindrical, elongate body with relatively convex, yellow-orange elytra and wide transverse black wavy stripes. Head is square shaped, with a flat forehead. Antennae are black and long with eleven segments. Pronotum is long and wide, with parallel sides. The size of the black markings and the color of elytra are very variable (hence the specie name variabilis). The color of their elytra can range from a yellow, to orange to a light brown. Normally they have three black bands. The 1st and 2nd bands are sometimes divided into four distinct spots. They are however distinguished from the similar species by a black stripe ath the end of the abdomen. This species is very similar to Mylabris pannonica Kaszab, 1956.

== Biology ==
This species has a very complex biological cycle. Adults fly from June to September, feeding on flowers. During the larval stage they feed on eggs and larvae of grasshoppers.

== Bibliography ==
- Heiko Bellmann (1999): Der Neue Kosmos Insektenführer. Franckh-Kosmos Verlags-GmbH & Co, Stuttgart. ISBN 3-440-07682-2
- Heiko Bellmann: Insectes d'Europe, Artemis, Poche nature 2007, (ISBN 978-2-84416-525-1)
- Michael Chinery, Insectes de France et d'Europe occidentale, Paris, Flammarion, août 2012, 320 p. (ISBN 978-2-0812-8823-2), p. 276
- Nikbakhtzadeh M.R., Tirgari S., 2002. Blister Beetles (Coleoptera: Meloidae) in Nahavand County (Hamedan Province, Iran) and Their Ecological Relationship to Other Coleopteran Families, Iranian J. Publ. Health, Vol. 31, Nos. 1-2, PP. 55-62.
- Özbek H., Szaloki D., 1998. A contribution to the knowledge of the Meloidae (Coleoptera) fauna of Turkey along with new records, TÜBİTAK, Tr. J. of Zoology 22, 23-40.
