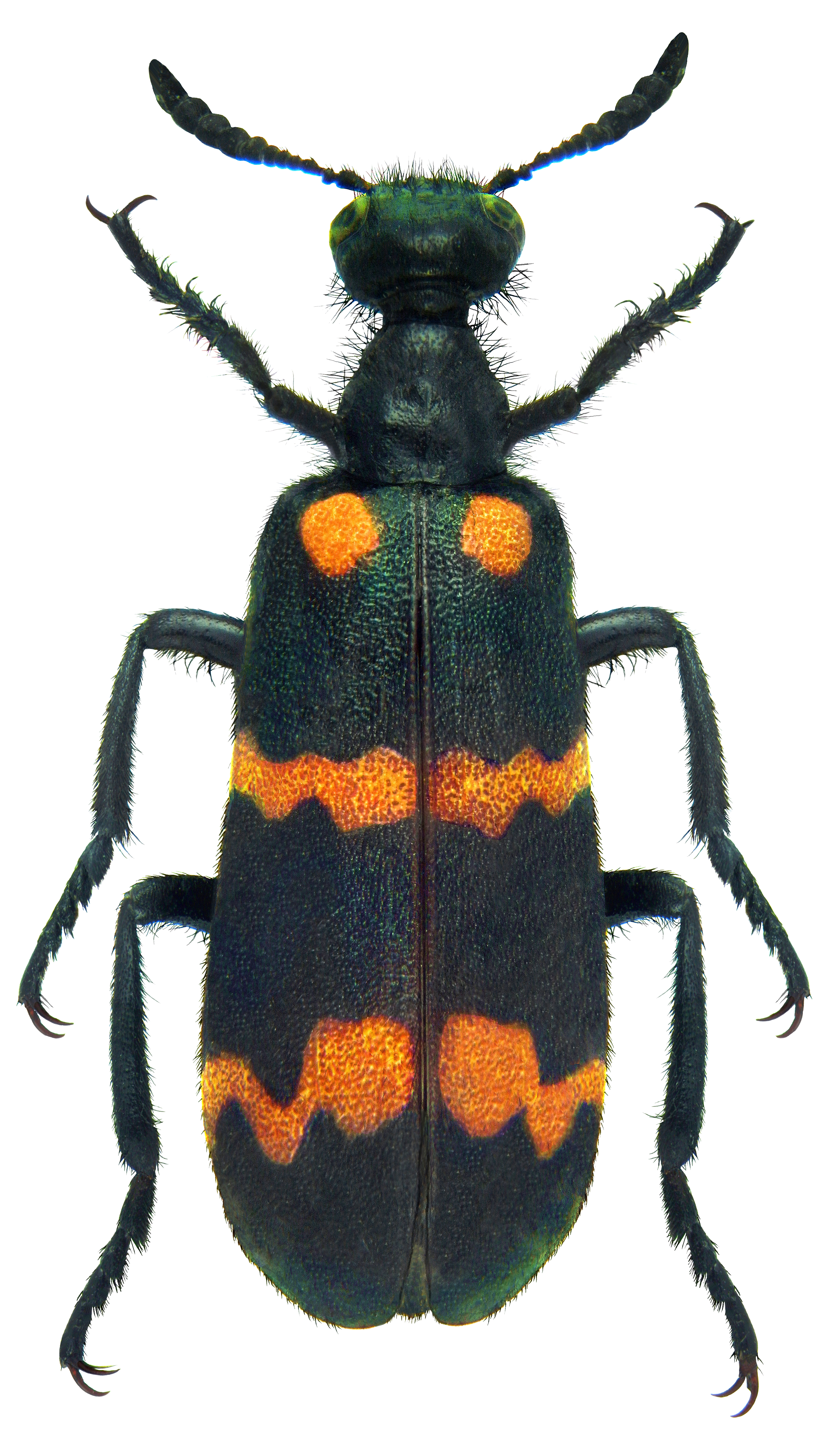
- Hycleus species in the phaleratus group

Scientific classification
- Kingdom: Animalia
- Phylum: Arthropoda
- Clade: Pancrustacea
- Class: Insecta
- Order: Coleoptera
- Suborder: Polyphaga
- Infraorder: Cucujiformia
- Family: Meloidae
- Genus: Hycleus; Latreille, 1817

Synonyms
- Coryna Billberg, 1813; Decatoma Dejean, 1821; Dices Dejean, 1821; Arithmema Chevrolat, 1844; Decapotoma Voigts, 1902; Euzonabris Kuzin, 1954; Sphenabris Kuzin, 1954; Tigrabris Kuzin, 1954; Gorrizia Pardo Alcaide, 1954; Androfoveata Pardo Alcaide, 1954; Mesogorbata Pardo Alcaide, 1954; Mesoscutata Pardo Alcaide, 1954; Mesotaeniata Pardo Alcaide, 1955

= Hycleus =

Genus of beetles

Hycleus is a genus of blister beetle belonging to the Meloidae family found in Africa and Asia. The genus contains over 400 species, which historically have been confused with the genus Mylabris.

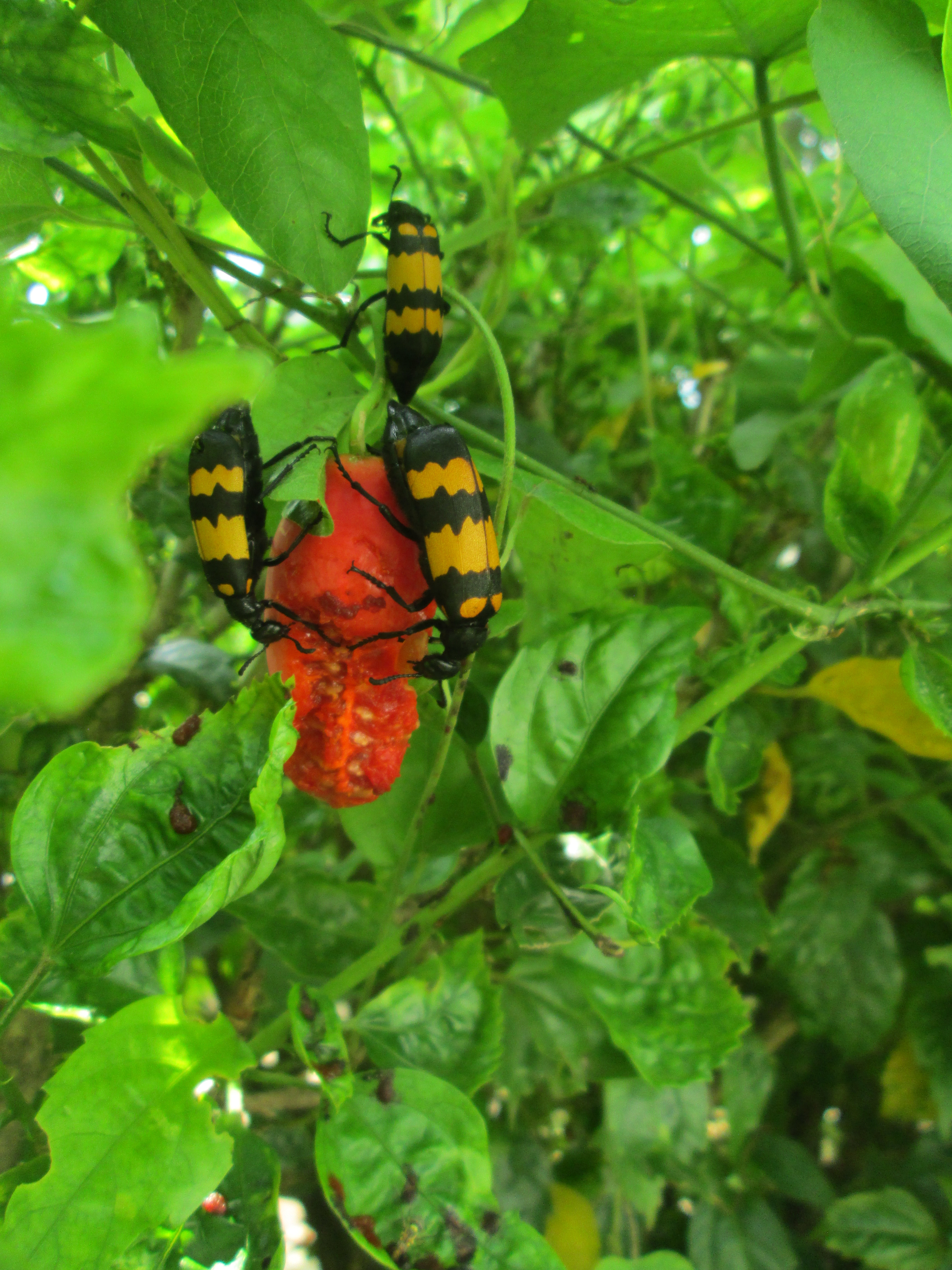
Hycleus beetle feeding on Coccinia grandis

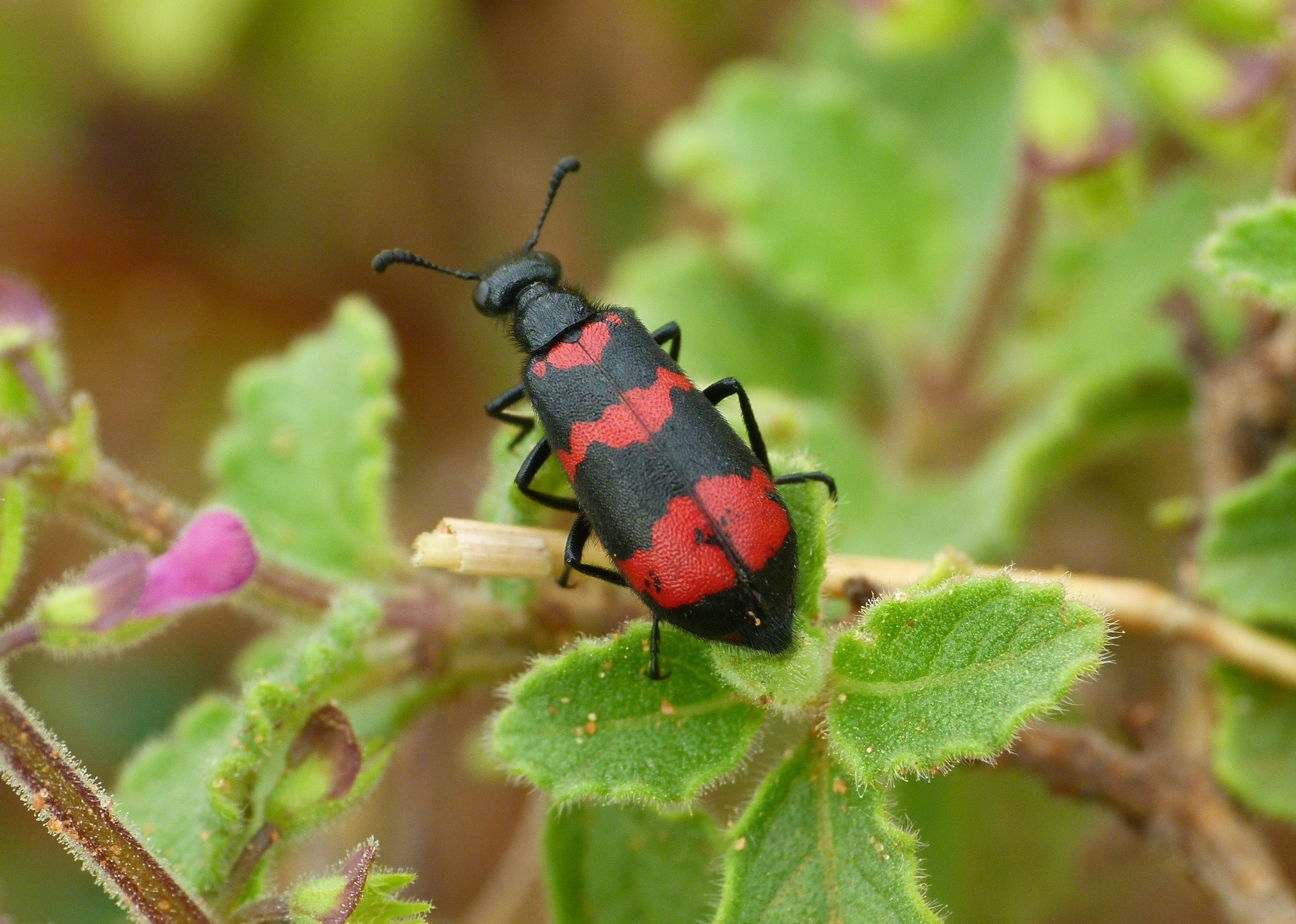
Hycleus thunbergi

== Ecology ==
Adults feed mainly on flowers from a wide range of plant families. The first larval instar is an active triungulin form that is a predator of soft insects such as aphids. While the young are often beneficial to crops by suppressing other plant feeders, the adults can be a problem when present in large numbers. Flower feeding leads to lower yield and this can be a problem in some leguminous crops. They are however easily controlled by manual collection.

In northern Nigeria, heavy infestations of Hycleus terminatus, Hycleus fimbriatus, Hycleus hermanniae, and Hycleus chevrolati have affected early plantings of pearl millet crops.

== Gallery ==
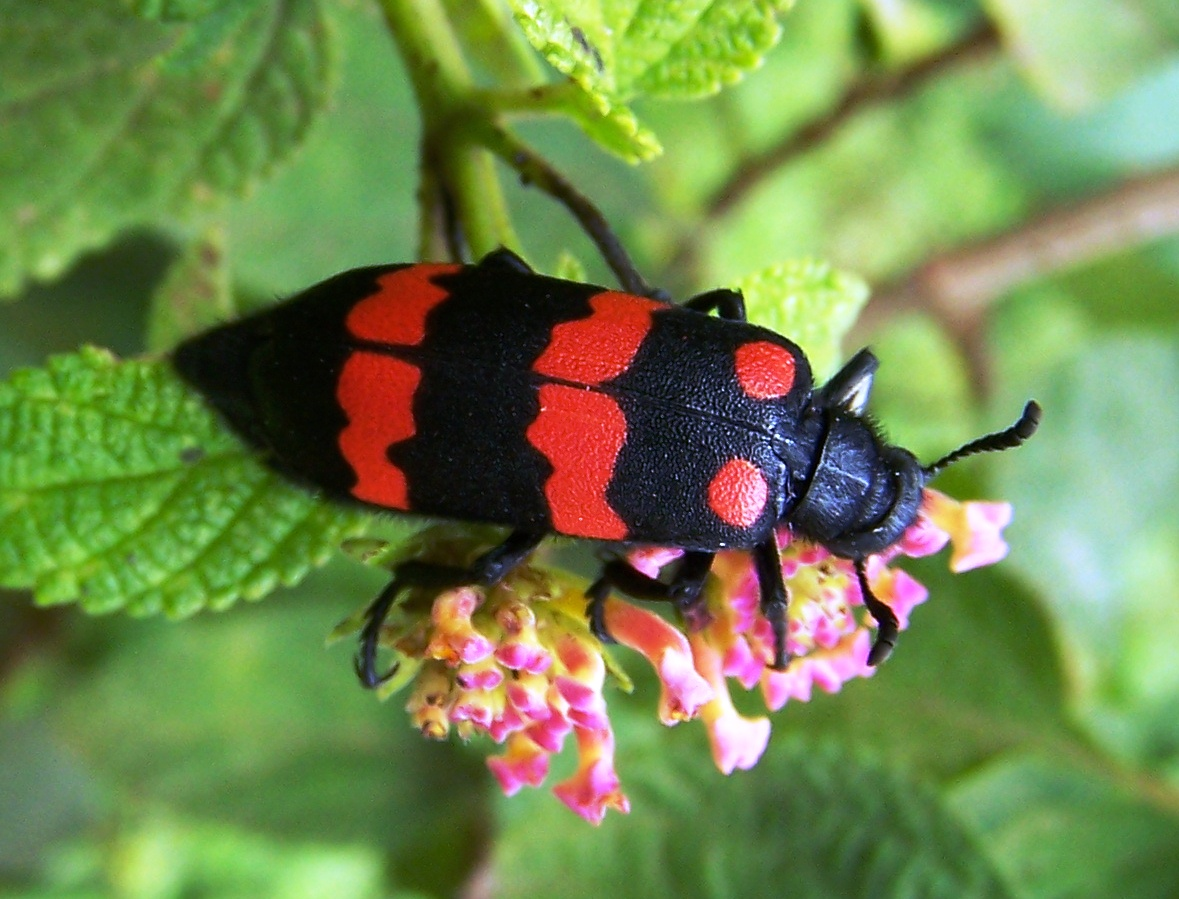
Seen in Karnataka

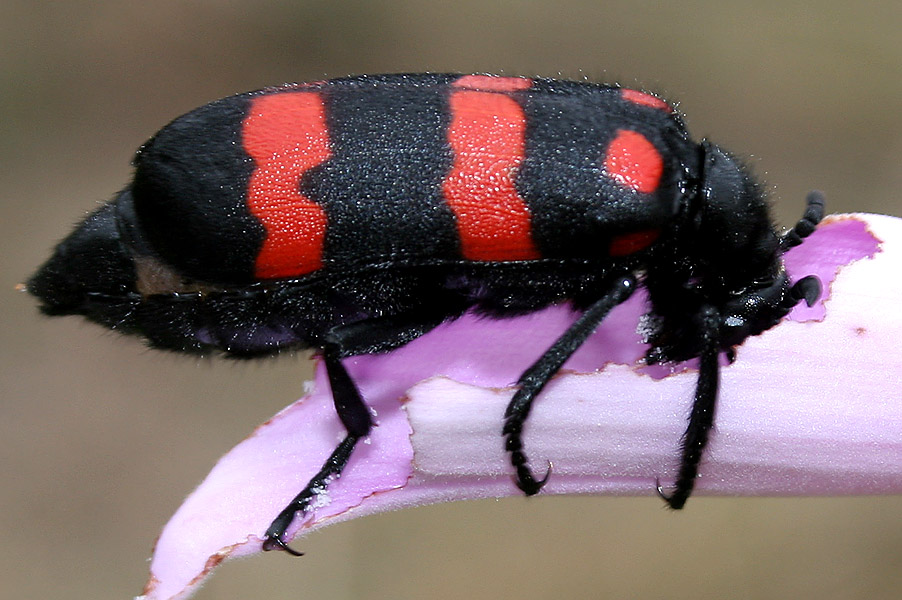

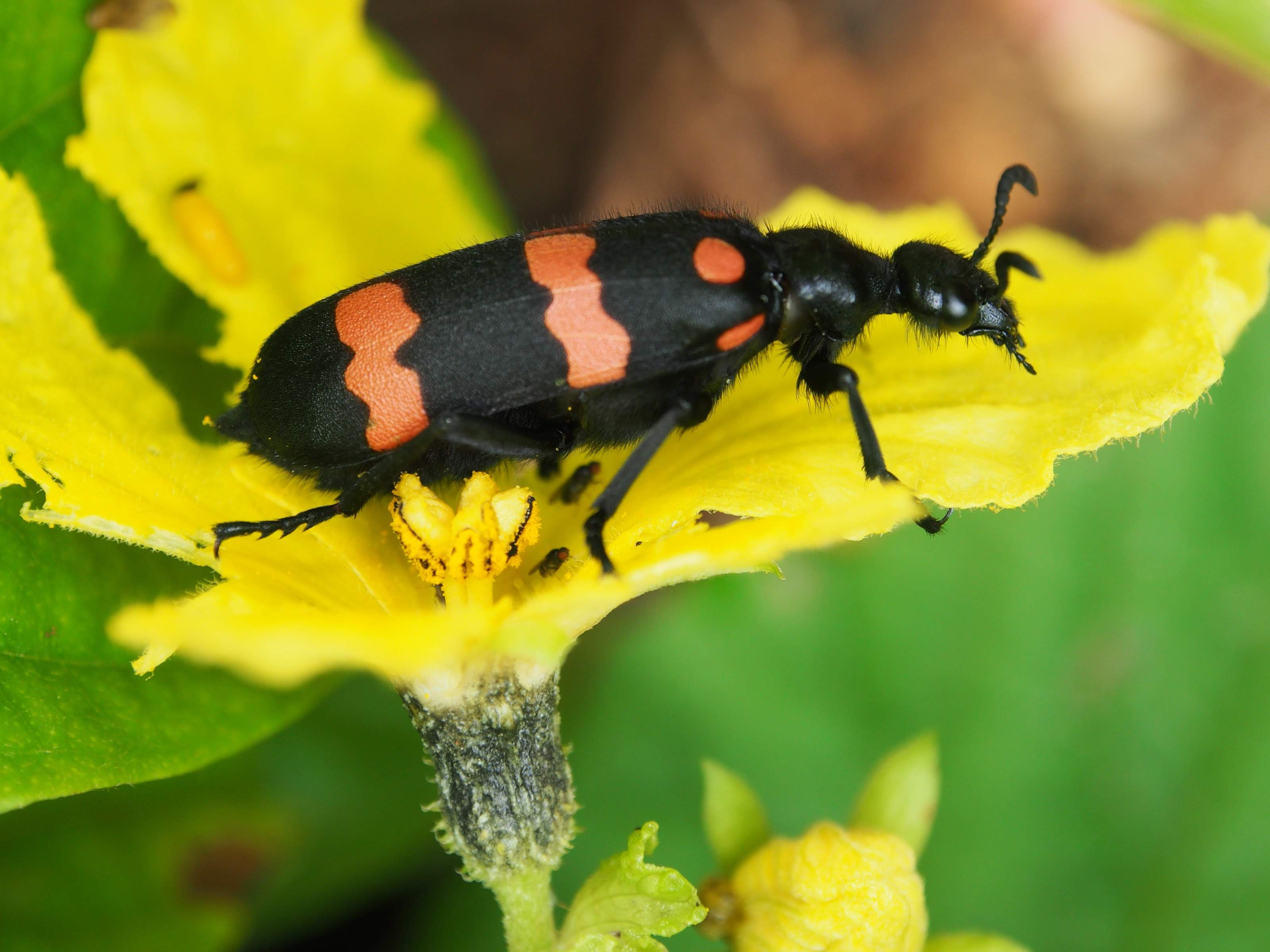
Orange Blister Beetle, Ransai, Maharashtra

== Partial list of species ==
- Hycleus aegyptiacus (Marseul, 1870)
- Hycleus allardi (Marseul, 1870)
- Hycleus apicipennis (Reiche, 1865)
- Hycleus arabicus (Pallas, 1781)
- Hycleus belli (Borchmann, 1940)
- Hycleus higuttatus (Gebler, 1841)
- Hycleus bipunctatus (A. G. Olivier, 1811)
- Hycleus birecurvus (Marseul, 1870)
- Hycleus bistillatus (Tan, 1981)
- Hycleus biundulatus (Pallas, 1782)
- Hycleus burchmannianus (Kaszab, 1983)
- Hycleus brevetarsalis (Kaszab, 1960)
- Hycleus chodschenticus (Ballion, 1878)
- Hycleus cingulatus (Faldermann, 1837)
- Hycleus colligatus (L. Redtenbacher, 1850)
- Hycleus concinnus (Marseul, 1870)
- Hycleus curticornis (Pic, 1919)
- Hycleus damohensis (Saha, 1979)
- Hycleus diversesignatus (Pic, 1919)
- Hycleus dohrni (Marseul, 1872)
- Hycleus dolens (Marseul, 1870)
- Hycleus esfandiarii (Kaszab, 1969)
- Hycleus flavohirtus (Kaszab, 1958)
- Hycleus gratiosus (Marseul, 1870)
- Hycleus hanguensis (Kaszab, 1958)
- Hycleus himalayaensis (Saha 1979)
- Hycleus hokumanensis (Kon6, 1940)
- Hycleus horai (Saha, 1972)
- Hycleus infasciculatus (Pic, 1929)
- Hycleus japonicus (Sumakov, 1913)
- Hycleus javeti (Marseu1, 1870)
- Hycleus kirgisicus (Aksentjev & Sadykova, 1990)
- Hycleus lacteus (Marseul, 1870)
- Hycleus ligatus (Marseu1, 1870)
- Hycleus lindbergi (Kaszab, 1973)
- Hycleus linnavuorii (Pardo Alcaide, 1963)
- Hycleus mannheimsi (Kaszab, 1961)
- Hycleus mediozigzagus (Pic, 1924)
- Hycleus mediobipunctatus (Pic, 1919)
- Hycleus mediofasciatellus (Pic, 1908)
- Hycleus medioinsignatus (Pic, 1909)
- Hycleus nigrohirtus (Kaszab, 1983)
- Hycleus ocellaris (A. G. Olivier, 1795)
- Hycleus oculatus (Thunb., 1791)
- Hycleus ornatus (Reiche, 1865)
- Hycleus parvulus (Friva1dszky, 1892)
- Hycleus phaleratus (Pallas, 1781)
- Hycleus pierrei (Kaszab, 1968)
- Hycleus pitcheri (Kaszab, 1983)
- Hycleus postbilunulatus (Pic, 1919)
- Hycleus posticatus (Fairmaire, 1892)
- Hycleus praeustus (Fabricius, 1793)
- Hycleus pseudobrunnipes (Kaszab, 1983)
- Hycleus quatuordecimpunctatus (Pallas, 1781)
- Hycleus raphael (Marseu1, 1876)
- Hycleus rotroui (Pic, 1930)
- Hycleus rubricollis (Marseul, 1875)
- Hycleus scabratus (Klug, 1845)
- Hycleus scapularis Klug, 1845)
- Hycleus schauffelei (Kaszab, 1957)
- Hycleus schoenherri (Billberg, 1813)
- Hycleus sialanus (Pic, 1929)
- Hycleus silbermanni (Chevrolat, 1838)
- Hycleus solanensis (Saha, 1979)
- Hycleus soumacovi (Pic, 1930)
- Hycleus subparallelus (Pic, 1919)
- Hycleus talhouki (Kaszab, 1983)
- Hycleus talyshensis (Sumakov, 1929)
- Hycleus tekkensis (Heyden, 1883)
- Hycleus tenuepictus (Fairmaire, 1892)
- Hycleus theryanus (Pic, 1940)
- Hycleus thunbergi (Billberg, 1813)
- Hycleus tigripennis (Marseul, 1870)
- Hycleus trianguliferus (Heyden, 1883)
- Hycleus varius (A. G. Olivier, 1811)
- Hycleus wagneri (Chevrolat, 1838)
