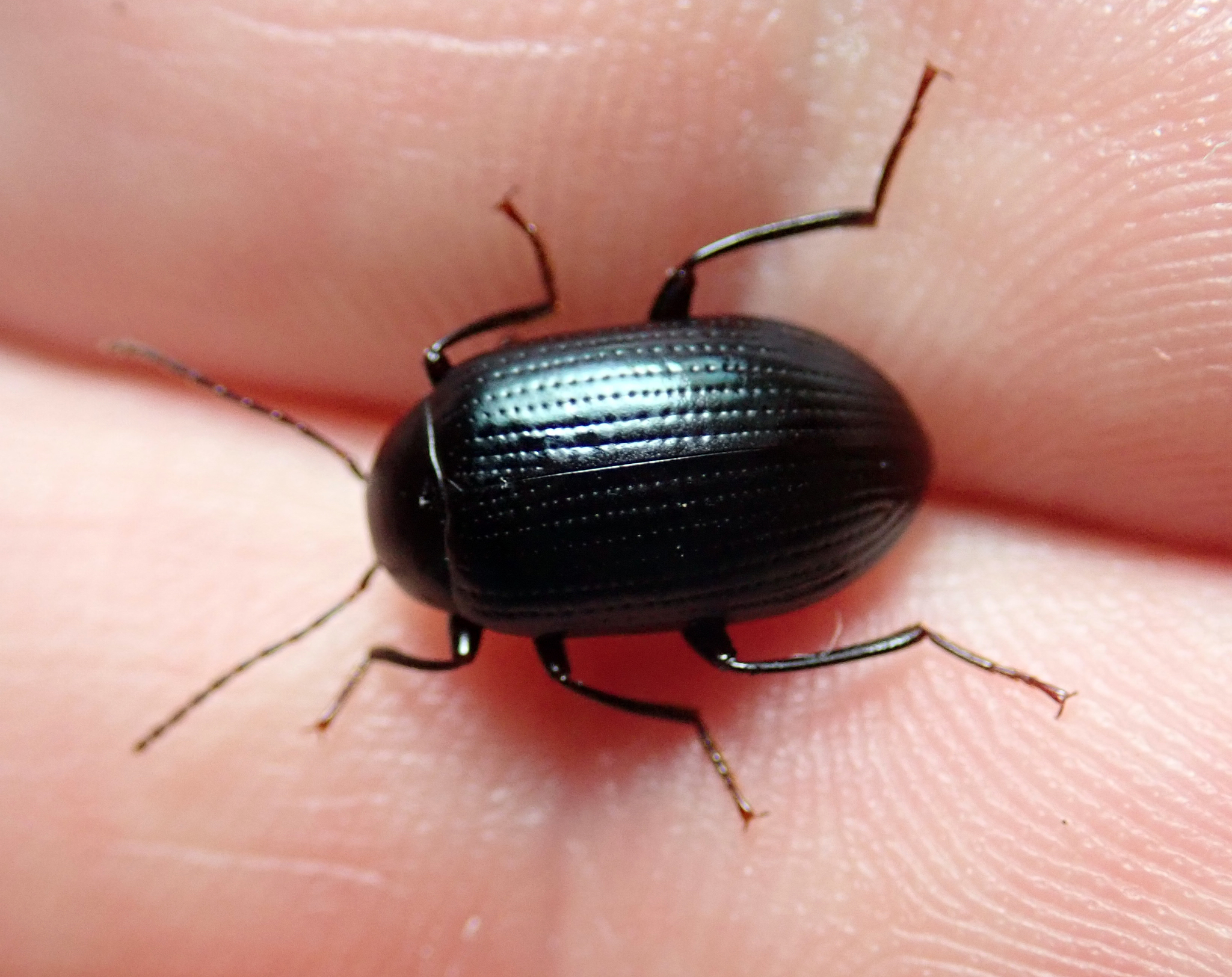
- Amarygmus watti, New Zealand

Scientific classification
- Kingdom: Animalia
- Phylum: Arthropoda
- Clade: Pancrustacea
- Class: Insecta
- Order: Coleoptera
- Suborder: Polyphaga
- Infraorder: Cucujiformia
- Family: Tenebrionidae
- Subfamily: Tenebrioninae
- Tribe: Amarygmini; Gistel, 1848

= Amarygmini =

Tribe of beetles

Amarygmini is a tribe of darkling beetles in the family Tenebrionidae. There are more than 80 genera in Amarygmini.

== Description ==
Adult Amarygmini are active long-legged beetles that fly readily. They have an unhidden membrane between the front margin of the clypeus and the labrum. In males, the base of the aedeagus is asymmetric, more or less acutely drawn out, directed towards the right and fused with the parameres. The dorsal side of the aedeagus is directed towards the dorsum of the body.

Most larvae of Amarygmini have a regular, oval excavation on the ninth abdominal tergite. The Australian Chalcopteroides is an exception, instead having short urogomphi borne on an oblique projection.

== Life cycle ==
Like other beetles, Amarygmini go through complete metamorphosis with the life stages of egg, larva, pupa and adult. Amarygmini are one of several tenebrionid groups to have long-lived larvae and comparatively short-lived adults.

== Ecology ==
Most Amarygmini adults are associated with tree bark or dead wood, especially that which is covered/mixed with fungi or lichen. They occur in both natural (e.g. primary and secondary forests) and artificial (e.g. street trees, parks, gardens) habitats. They are nocturnal. A few species are attracted to artificial light. Larvae are believed to feed on wood (xylophagous) or fungi (mycophagous).

At least some larvae of Chalcopteroides live in soil. Some species of this genus are believed to be scavengers or predators, based on the presence of arthropod fragments in their guts.

== Genera ==
These genera belong to the tribe Amarygmini:

- Alienoplonyx Bremer, 2019 (Indomalaya)
- Alymon Pascoe, 1866 (tropical Africa)
- Amarygmus Dalman, 1823 (the Palearctic, Indomalaya, Australasia, and Oceania)
- Asthenochirus Fairmaire, 1885 (tropical Africa)
- Asyleptus Péringuey, 1896 (tropical Africa)
- Atropsorodes Ardoin, 1963 (tropical Africa)
- Axynaon Blackburn, 1897 (Australasia)
- Azarelius Fairmaire, 1892 (Indomalaya)
- Bunamarygmus Masumoto, 1988 (Indomalaya)
- Cantaloubeus Ardoin, 1959 (tropical Africa)
- Caudamarygmus Bremer, 2001 (Indomalaya)
- Cephalamarygmus Bremer, 2001 (Indomalaya)
- Cerysia Bremer, 2001 (Indomalaya and Australasia)
- Chalcoplonyx Ardoin, 1963 (tropical Africa)
- Chalcopteroides Gebien, 1948 (Australasia)
- Cheiroplus Ardoin, 1963 (tropical Africa)
- Cleognathus Gebien, 1921 (tropical Africa)
- Coccimarygmus Ardoin, 1966 (tropical Africa)
- Crypsinous Fairmaire, 1891 (tropical Africa)
- Cymatothes Dejean, 1834 (North America and the Neotropics)
- Dalmanius Bremer, 2001 (Indomalaya)
- Dasyplonyx Bremer, 2014 (Indomalaya)
- Dichotymus Fairmaire, 1891 (tropical Africa)
- Erycastus Fairmaire, 1897 (tropical Africa)
- Euglyptonotus Gestro, 1901 (tropical Africa)
- Eulytus C.O. Waterhouse, 1882 (tropical Africa)
- Eumolpamarygmus Pic, 1923 (Indomalaya)
- Eumolparamarygmus Bremer, 2006 (Indomalaya)
- Eupezoplonyx Pic, 1922 (Indomalaya)
- Eupezus Dejean, 1834 (tropical Africa)
- Euspinamarygmus Masumoto, 1989 (Indomalaya)
- Fahraeus Ardoin, 1963 (tropical Africa)
- Falsastenochirus Pic, 1938 (tropical Africa)
- Falsoplonyx Ardoin, 1963 (tropical Africa)
- Falsosynopticus Pic, 1936 (tropical Africa)
- Garambanus Ardoin, 1964 (tropical Africa)
- Gonocnemis J. Thomson, 1858 (tropical Africa and Indomalaya)
- Gonocnemocistela Pic, 1935 (tropical Africa)
- Hesseodes Ardoin, 1963 (tropical Africa)
- Hoplobrachium Fairmaire, 1886 (tropical Africa and Indomalaya)
- Hoplonyx J. Thomson, 1858 (tropical Africa)
- Hypamarygmus Gebien, 1904 (tropical Africa)
- Insolitoplonyx Bremer, 2014 (Indomalaya)
- Isopteroplonyx Bremer, 2006 (Australasia)
- Javamarygmus Pic, 1928 (Indomalaya)
- Lemoultia Chatanay, 1913 (tropical Africa)
- Lobatopezus Pic, 1952 (Indomalaya)
- Luzonoplonyx Bremer, 2009 (Indomalaya)
- Macrosynopticus Pic, 1922 (Indomalaya)
- Megacantha Westwood, 1843 (tropical Africa)
- Meracantha W. Kirby, 1837 (North America)
- Meroxys Ardoin, 1963 (tropical Africa)
- Mimosynopticus Pic, 1922 (tropical Africa)
- Neoplonyx Ardoin, 1963 (tropical Africa)
- Nepaloplonyx Bremer, 2014 (Indomalaya)
- Nesioticus Westwood, 1843 (tropical Africa)
- Oplocheirus Lacordaire, 1859 (tropical Africa)
- Overlaetia Pic, 1937 (tropical Africa)
- Paragonocnemis Kraatz, 1899 (tropical Africa and Indomalaya)
- Paramarygmus Quedenfeldt, 1885 (tropical Africa)
- Pilosoplonyx Bremer, 2014 (Indomalaya)
- Pimelionotus Ardoin, 1963 (tropical Africa)
- Platypsorodes Ardoin, 1963 (tropical Africa)
- Plegacerus Gebien, 1921 (tropical Africa)
- Plesiophthalmus Motschulsky, 1857 (North America, tropical Africa, and Australasia)
- Plinthochrous Fairmaire, 1891 (tropical Africa)
- Podacamptus Ardoin, 1964 (tropical Africa)
- Pontianacus Fairmaire, 1898 (Indomalaya)
- Pseudalymon Ardoin, 1969 (tropical Africa)
- Pseudoogeton Masumoto, 1989 (the Palearctic and Indomalaya)
- Psilocastus Ardoin, 1963 (tropical Africa)
- Psoroderes Ardoin, 1962 (tropical Africa)
- Psorodes Dejean, 1834 (tropical Africa)
- Psorophodes Ardoin, 1963 (tropical Africa)
- Pterodes Ardoin, 1963 (tropical Africa)
- Pubamarygmus Pic, 1915 (Australasia)
- Reichenspergeria Wasmann, 1921 (Indomalaya)
- Seorsoplonyx Bremer, 2010 (Indomalaya)
- Singapura Gebien, 1925 (Indomalaya)
- Spathulipezus Gebien, 1921 (Australasia)
- Spinodietysus Pic, 1927 (Indomalaya)
- Stemmoderus Spinola, 1842 (tropical Africa)
- Sylvanoplonyx Bremer, 2010 (Indomalaya)
- Timogebienus Ardoin, 1963 (tropical Africa)
- Trichamarygmus Carter, 1913 (Australasia)
- Umslatus Péringuey, 1899 (tropical Africa)
- Vutsimus Péringuey, 1899 (tropical Africa)
- Ziaelas Fairmaire, 1892 (Indomalaya)

== Gallery ==
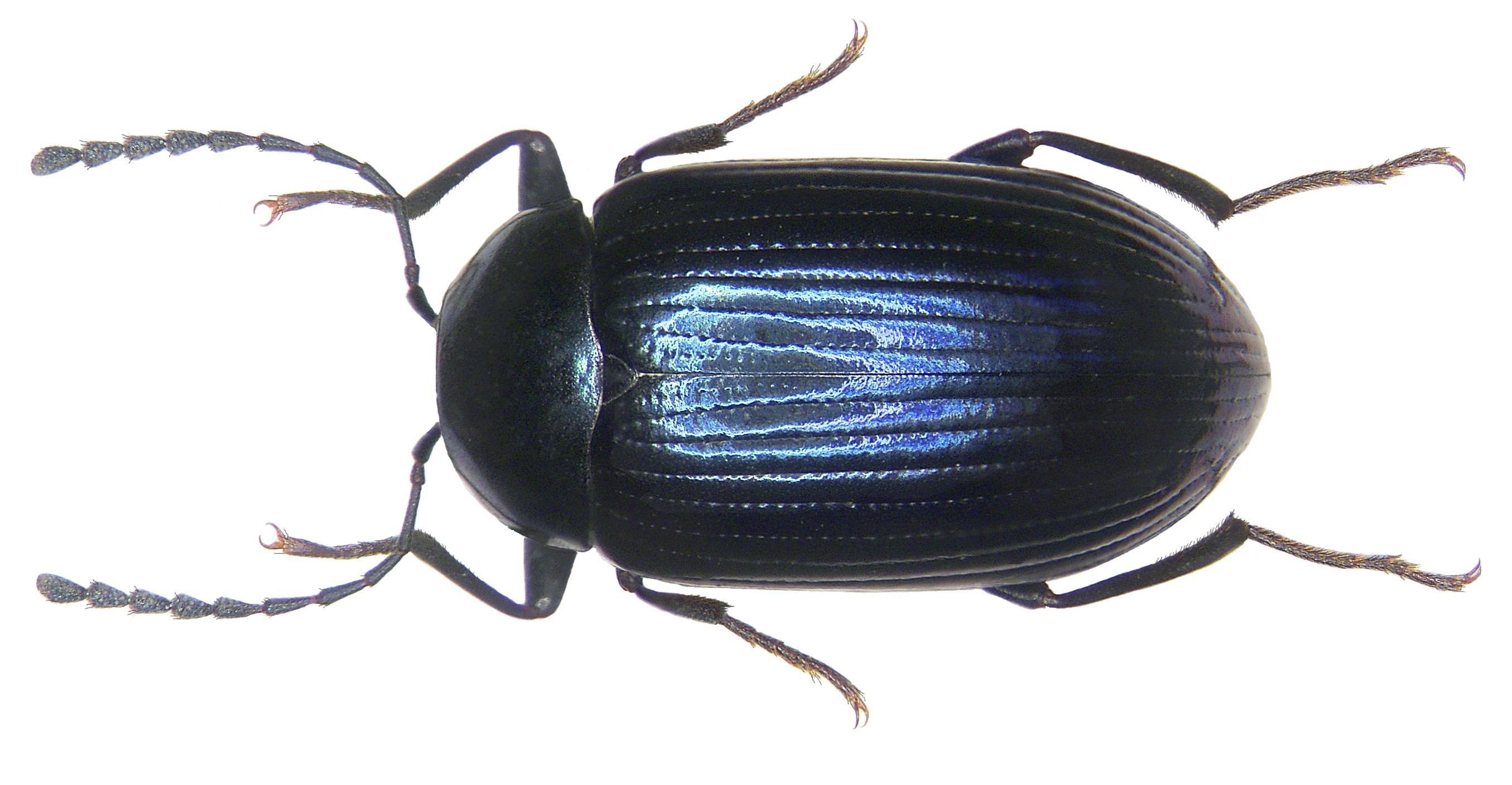
Amarygmus caesius

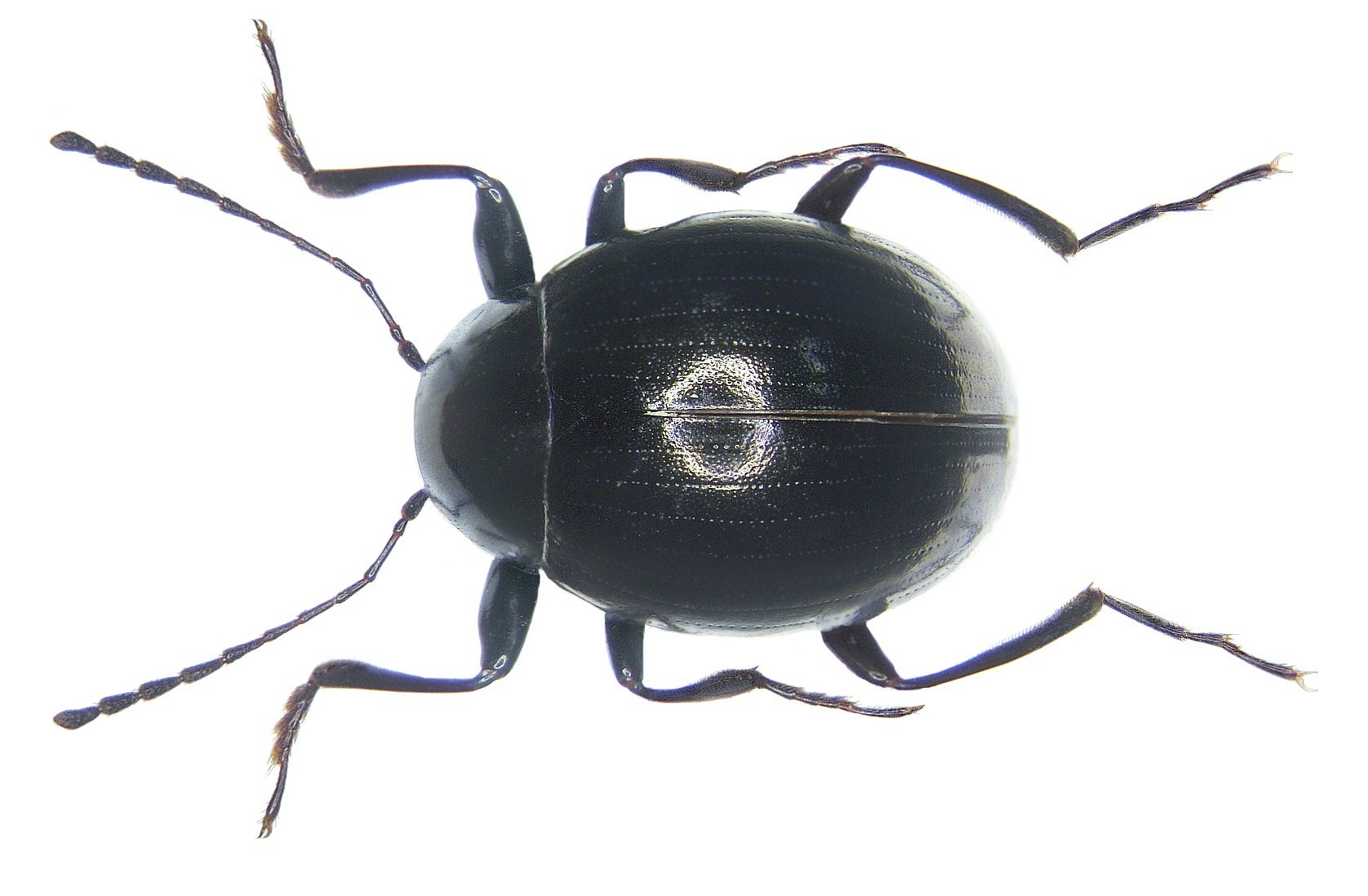
Amarygmus consobrinus

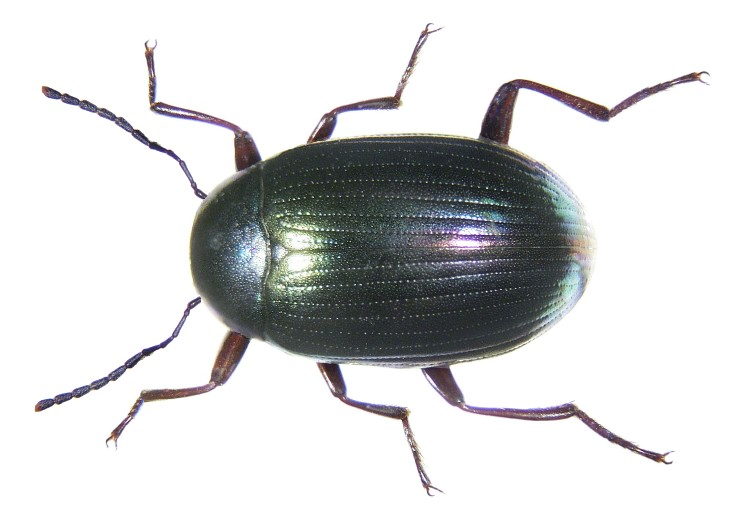
Amarygmus cuprarius iodicollis

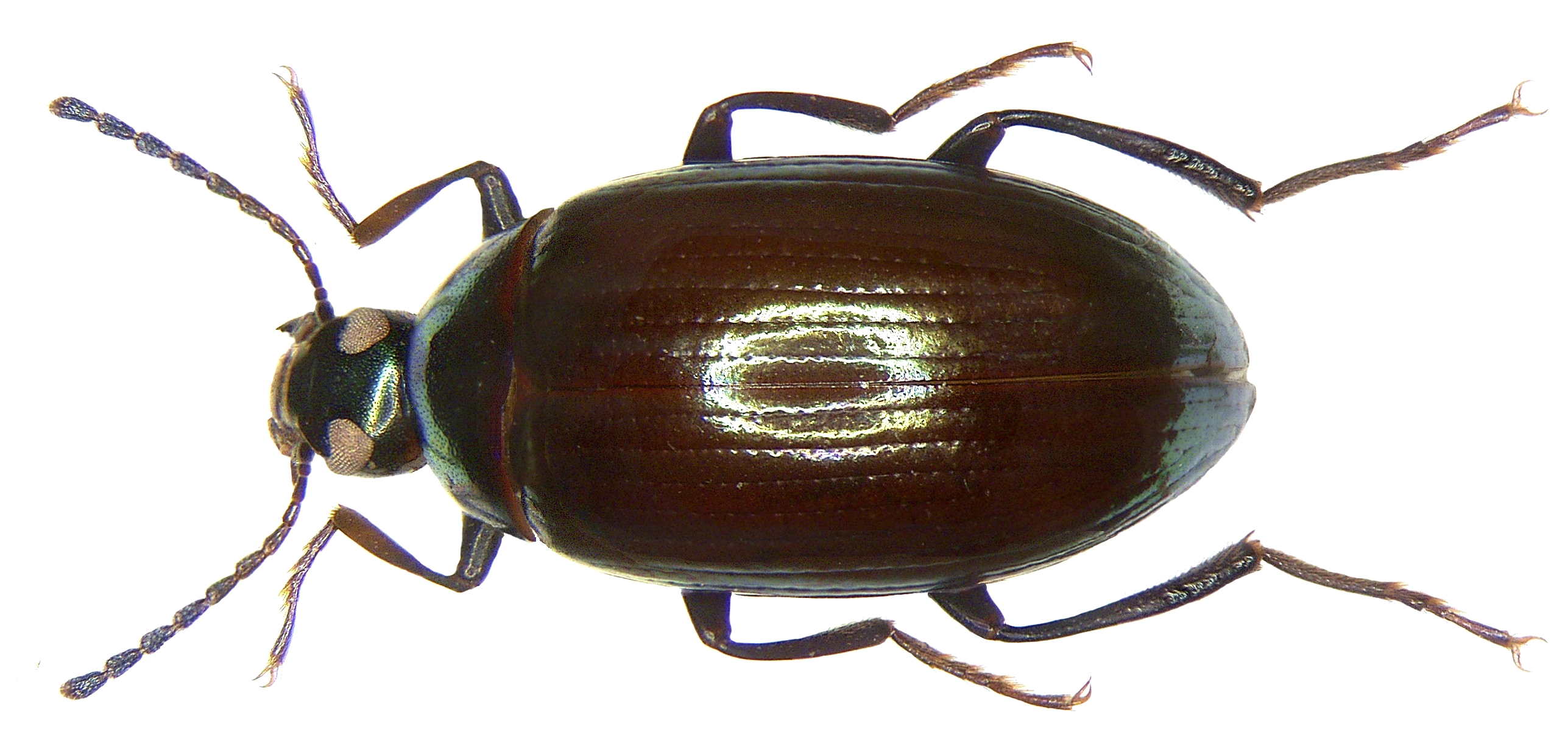
Amarygmus festivus

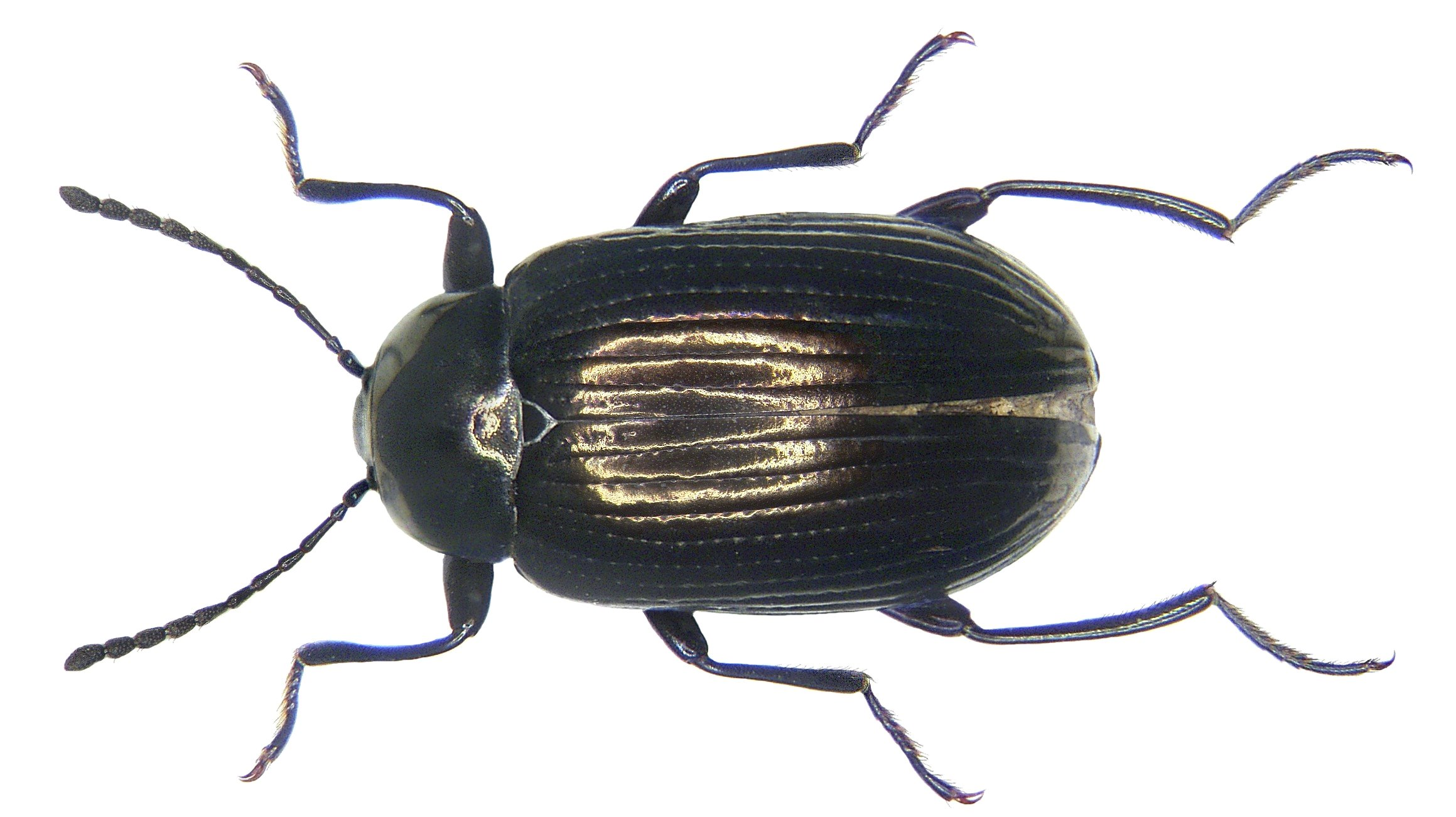
Amarygmus skalei

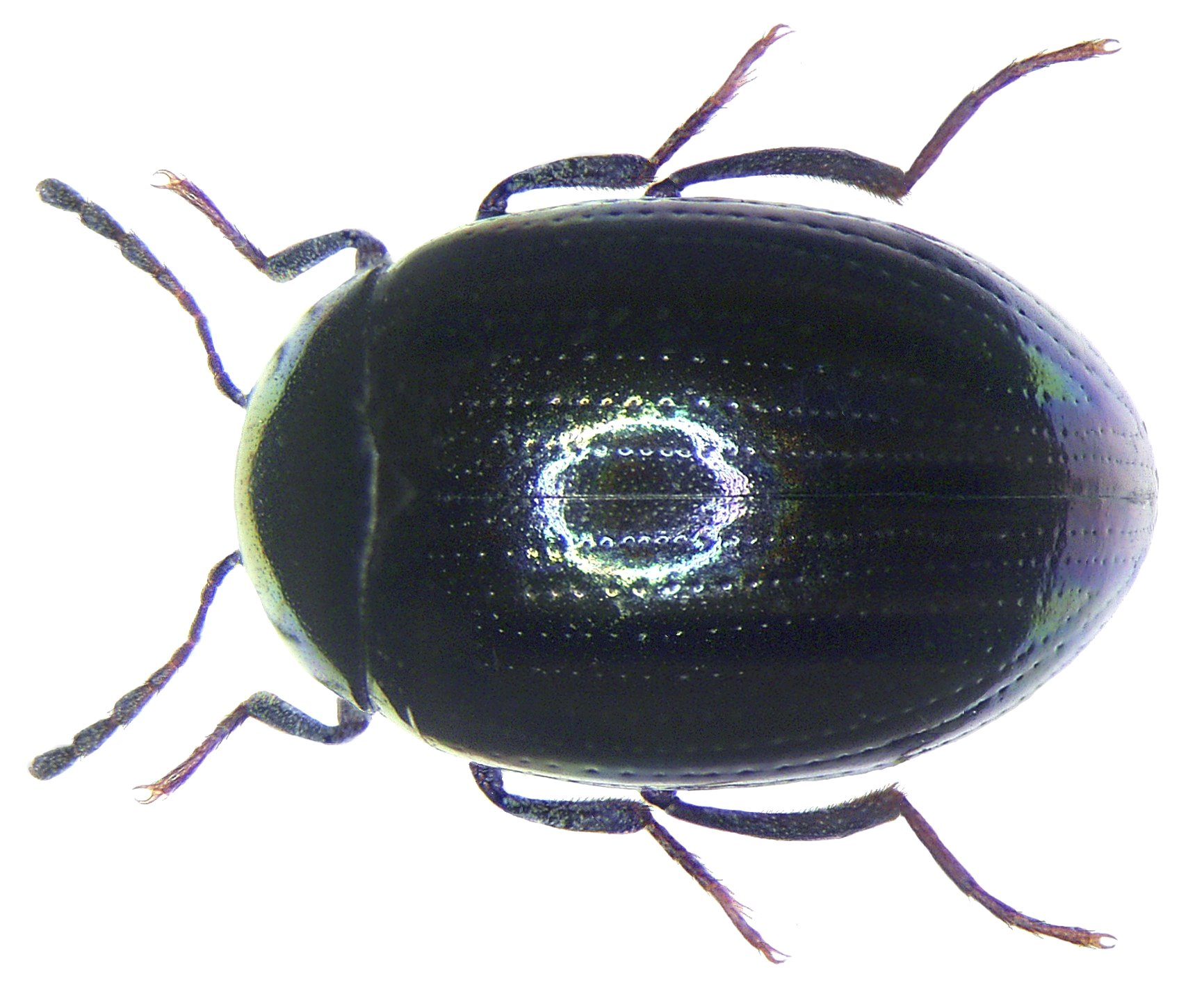
Amarygmus splendidulus

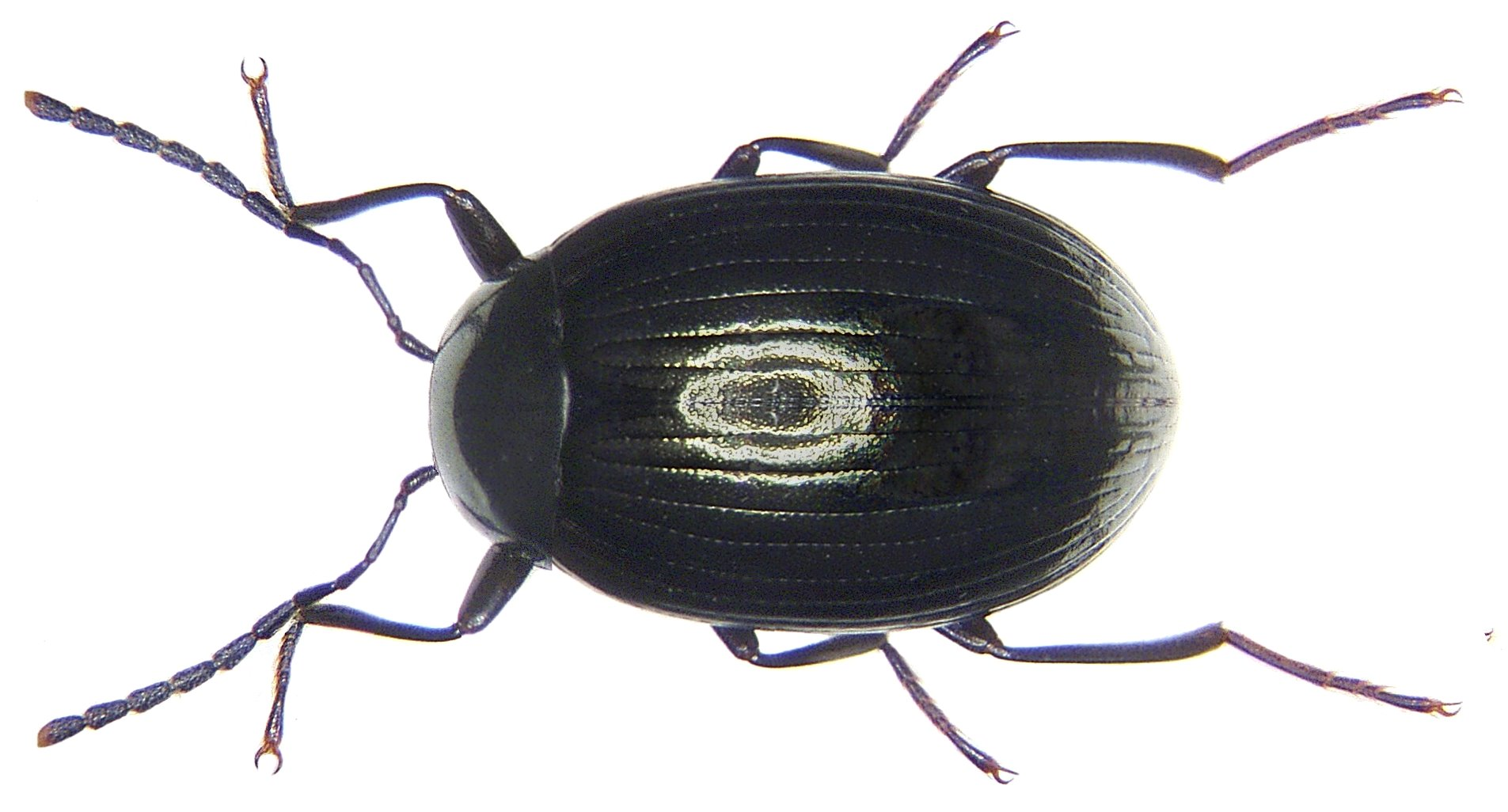
Amarygmus toliensis

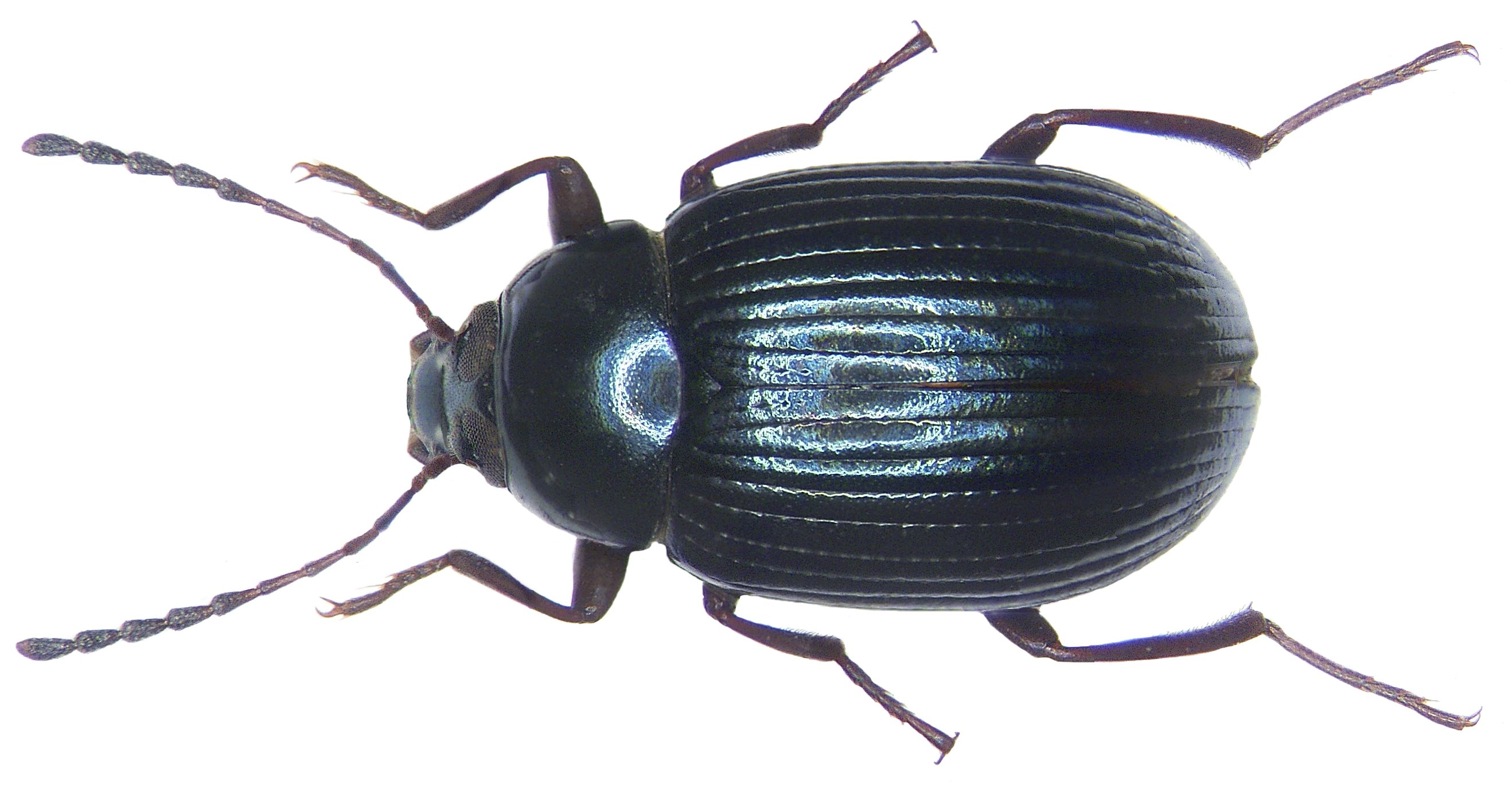
Amarygmus venetus

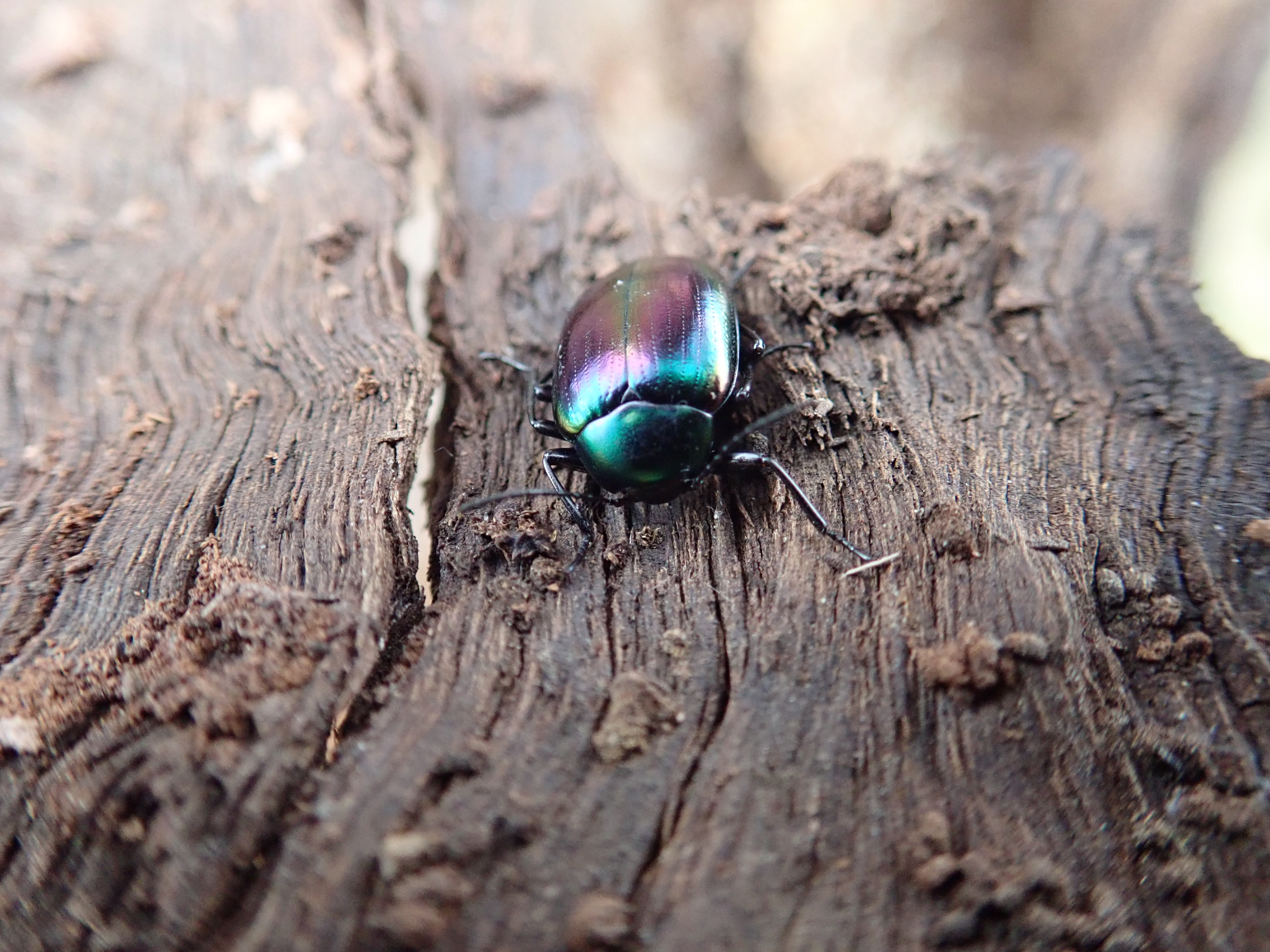
Chalcopteroides sp.

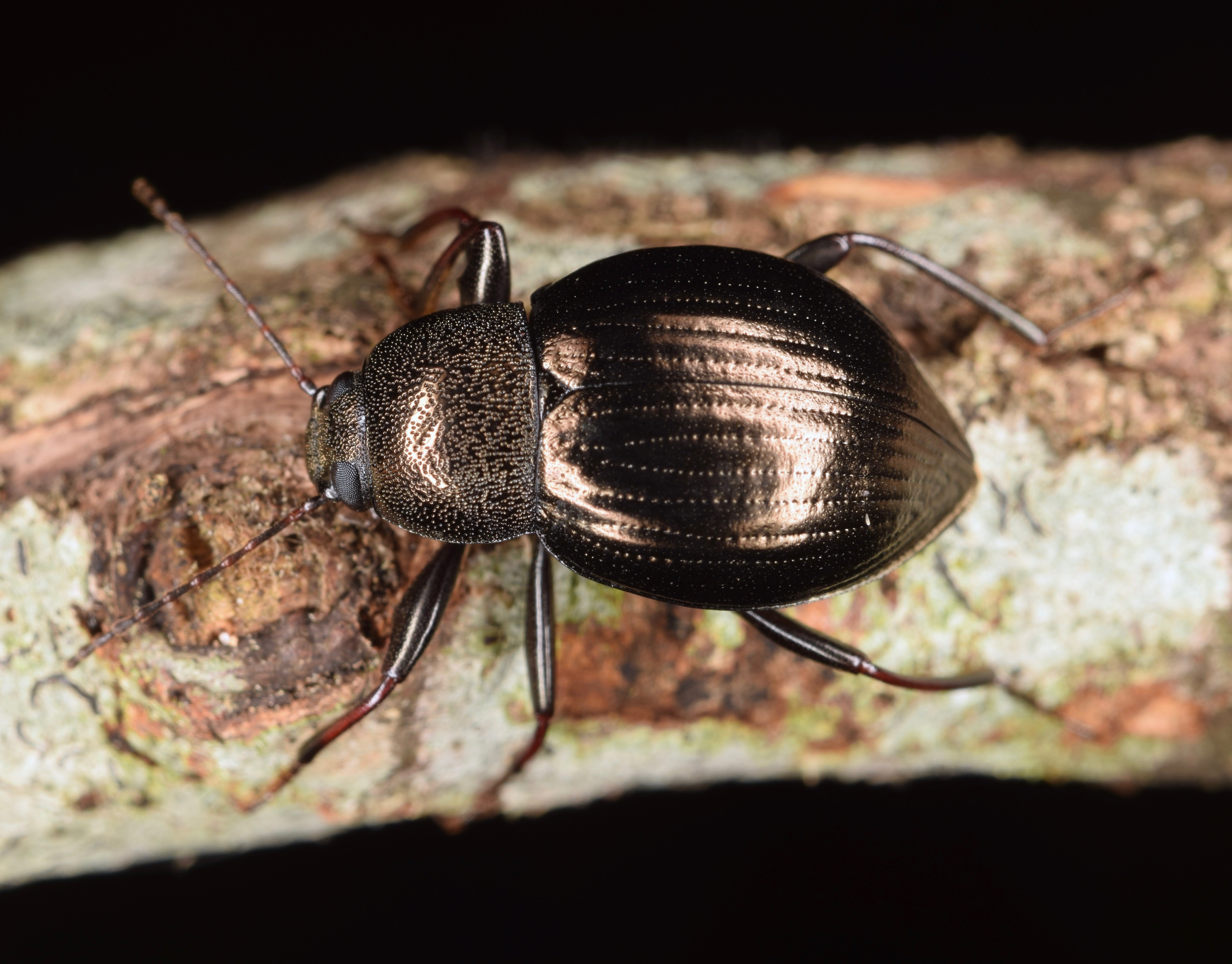
Meracantha contracta
