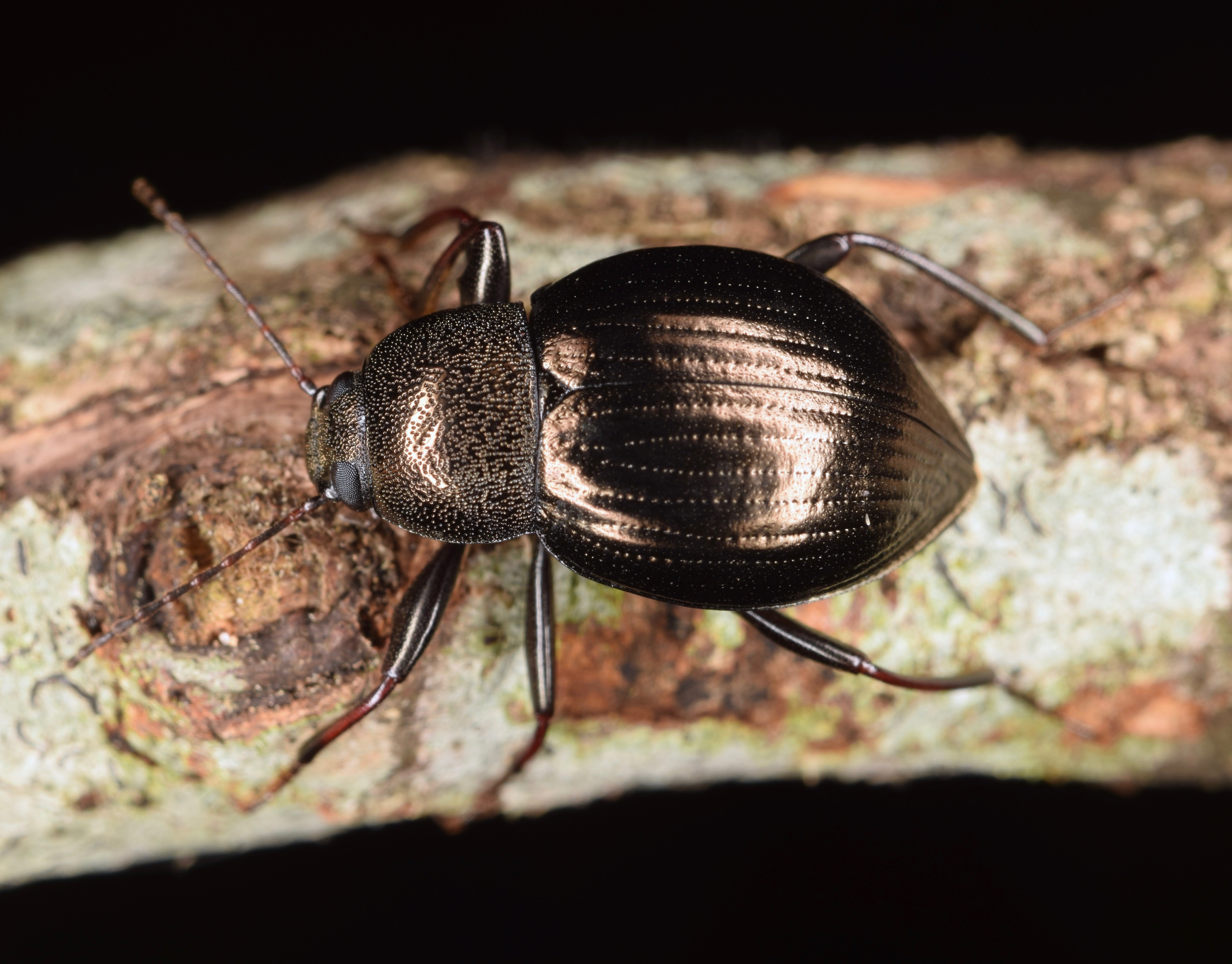
- Meracantha contracta

Scientific classification
- Domain: Eukaryota
- Kingdom: Animalia
- Phylum: Arthropoda
- Class: Insecta
- Order: Coleoptera
- Suborder: Polyphaga
- Infraorder: Cucujiformia
- Family: Tenebrionidae
- Tribe: Amarygmini
- Genus: Meracantha; Kirby, 1837

Species
- See text

= Meracantha =

Genus of beetles

Meracantha is a genus of darkling beetles found in North America. It contains one extant species, M. contracta, and also the extinct species M. lacustris.

== Description ==
Meracantha contracta ranges from 11 to 14 mm in length. The fossil from which M. lacustris was originally described is 10.5 mm long, and also differs from M. contracta in having more slender femora which are more strongly and suddenly clavate towards the tip.
