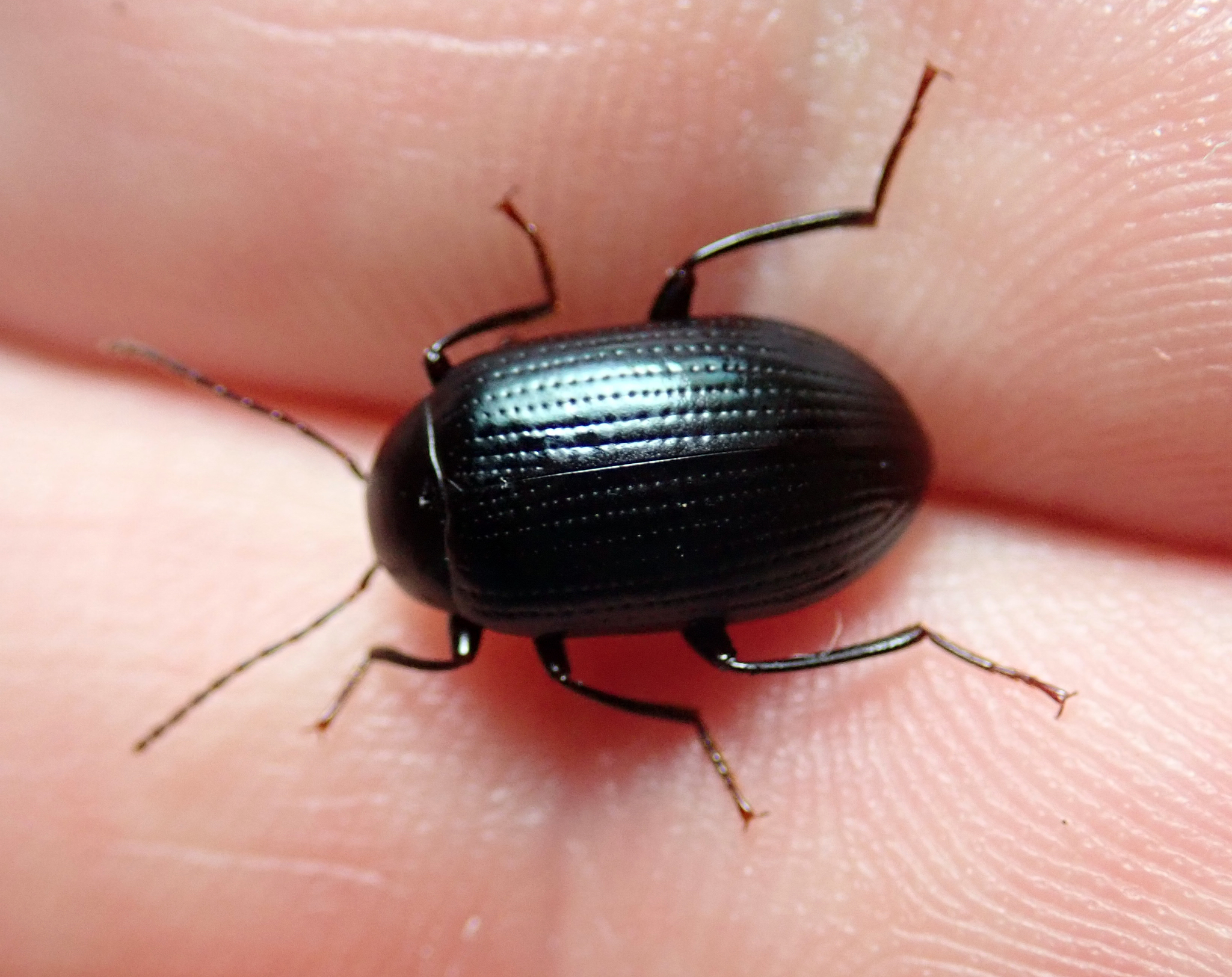
- Amarygmus watti, New Zealand

Scientific classification
- Domain: Eukaryota
- Kingdom: Animalia
- Phylum: Arthropoda
- Class: Insecta
- Order: Coleoptera
- Suborder: Polyphaga
- Infraorder: Cucujiformia
- Family: Tenebrionidae
- Tribe: Amarygmini
- Genus: Amarygmus; Dalman, 1823

= Amarygmus =

Genus of beetles

Amarygmus is a genus of darkling beetles (family Tenebrionidae). It is in the tribe Amarygmini and is the oldest genus of the tribe. The genus occurs in Australia (mainly in the north), New Guinea, Hawaii, Africa and Eurasia.

== Description ==
Amarygmus is a variable genus. Some descriptions of adults are given below:

- In species found in Borneo, the apices of the mandibles are bifid and not truncate. The femora of the legs are usually enlarged in the middle or at the apical third. There are hairs usually on the clypeus, legs, antennomeres and, frequently, as a sexual character on the underside of males. Traits found in related genera, such as long, erect hairs on pronotum and elytra (found in Bunamarygmus) are absent.
- In species found in Australia, the body is usually oval (rarely subparallel), convex and glabrous. Body length ranges from 6 to 15 mm. The colour is usually fuscous (dark) or black, sometimes metallic green or purple. The apices of the mandibles are bifid. The elytra are usually distinctly striate but sometimes only punctate. The tarsal vestiture is fulvous.

Larvae and pupae of A. morio have been described:

- The larva is elongate and cylindrical (similar to wireworms), with a shiny, strongly chitinised surface that is mostly yellow-brown. Most areas of the body have a few long, slender setae. The ninth abdominal tergum has a deep dorsal concavity with four small blunt teeth posteriorly.
- The pupa has a pronotum similar in shape to the adult pronotum. Each lateral border of the pronotum has approximately 25 short tubercles. The abdominal terga are broad and most are equipped with lateral processes. The ninth tergum has a pair of long, acute, diverging urogomphi.

== Ecology ==
Larvae of some species feed on lichens at night.

Larvae of A. morio have been collected from the trunk of a decayed mango tree.

Amarygmus tristis is associated with old woody plants, including Acacia mearnsii, Eucalyptus spp., Solanum mauritianum and Virgilia capensis. During the day, it occurs in holes or under bark. It is rather common in gardens.

== Gallery ==
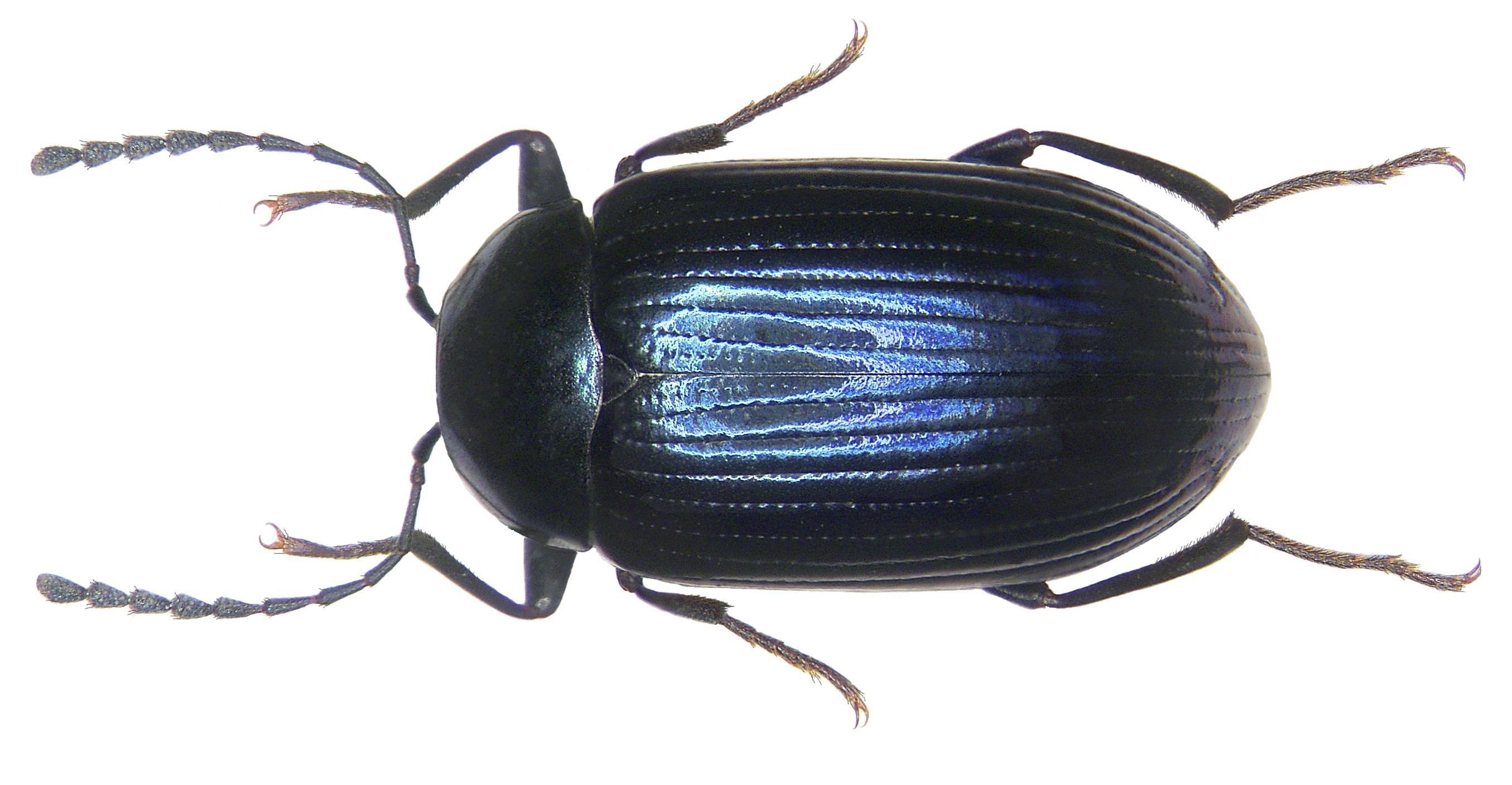
Amarygmus caesius

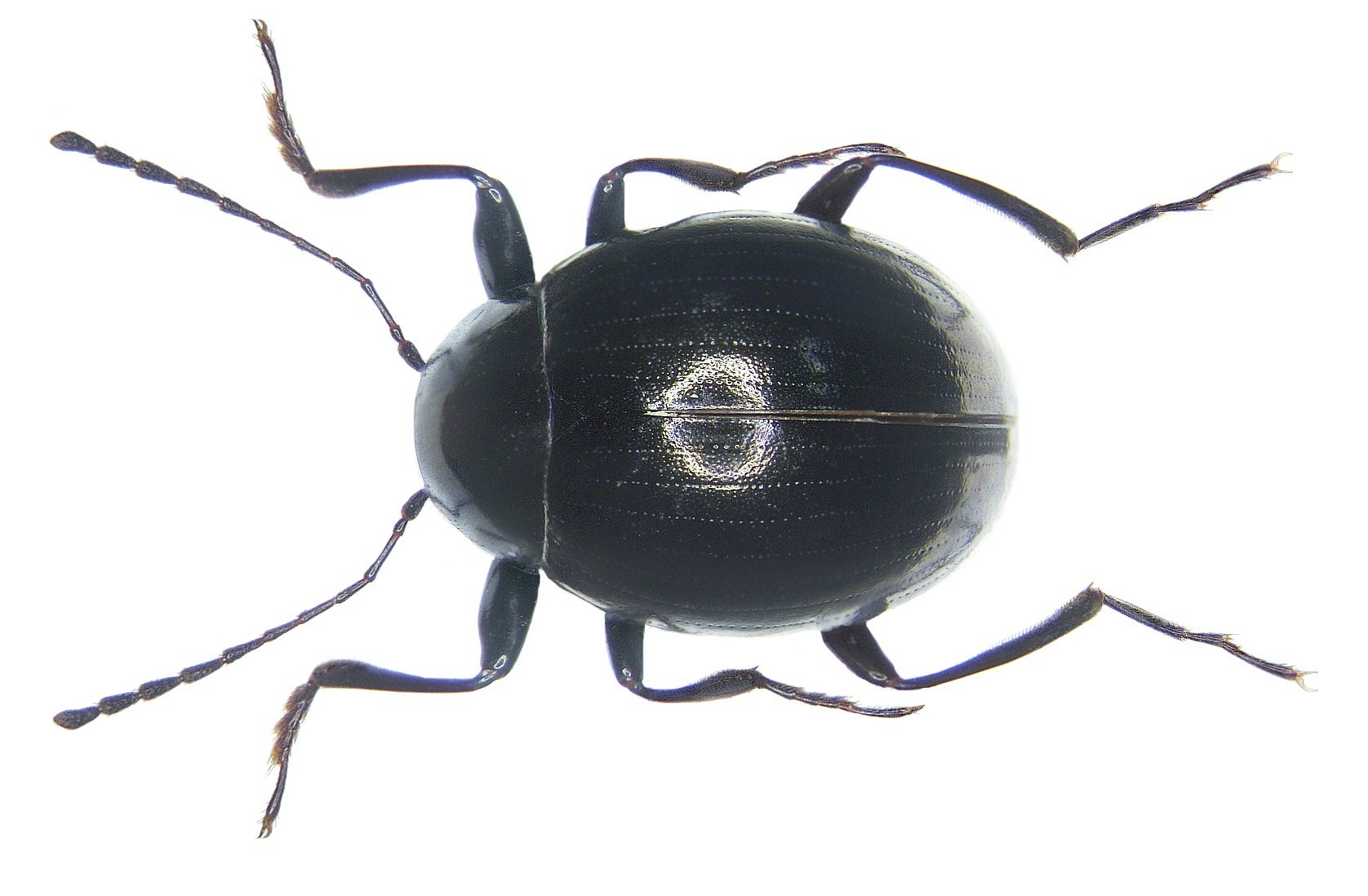
Amarygmus consobrinus

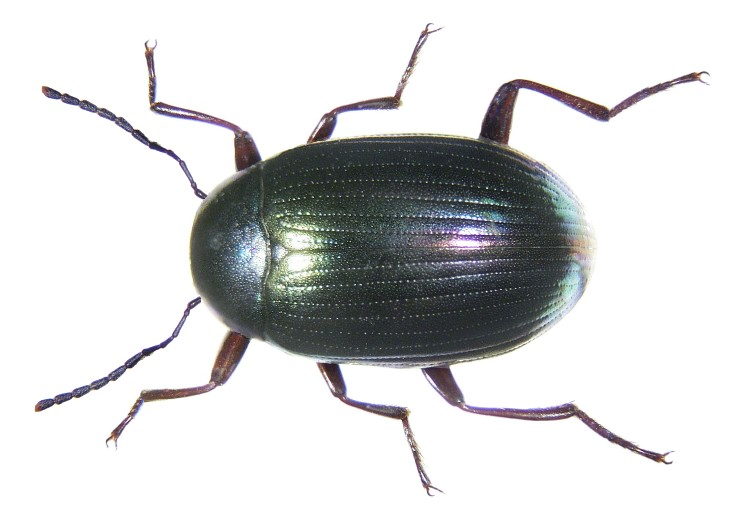
Amarygmus cuprarius iodicollis

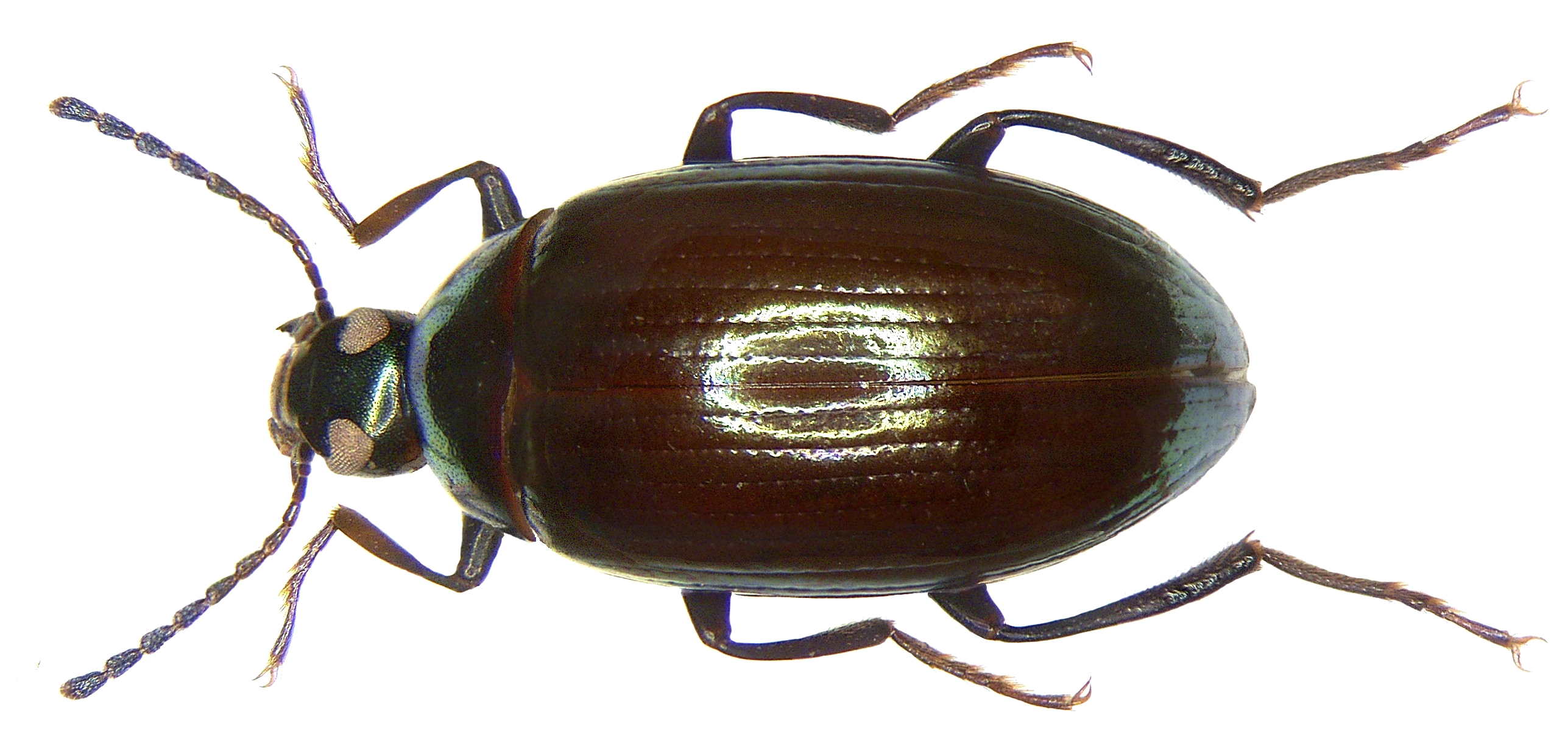
Amarygmus festivus

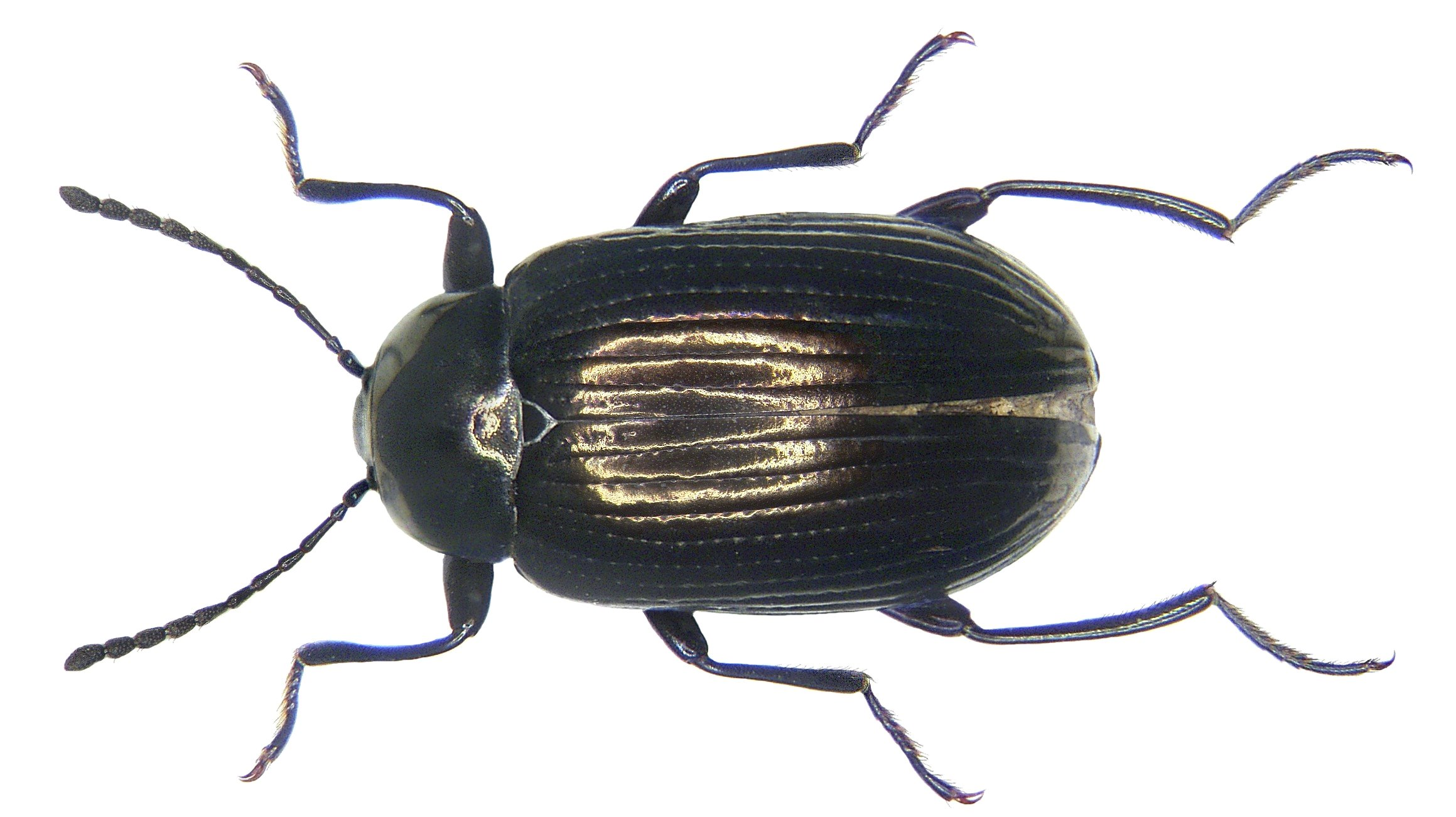
Amarygmus skalei

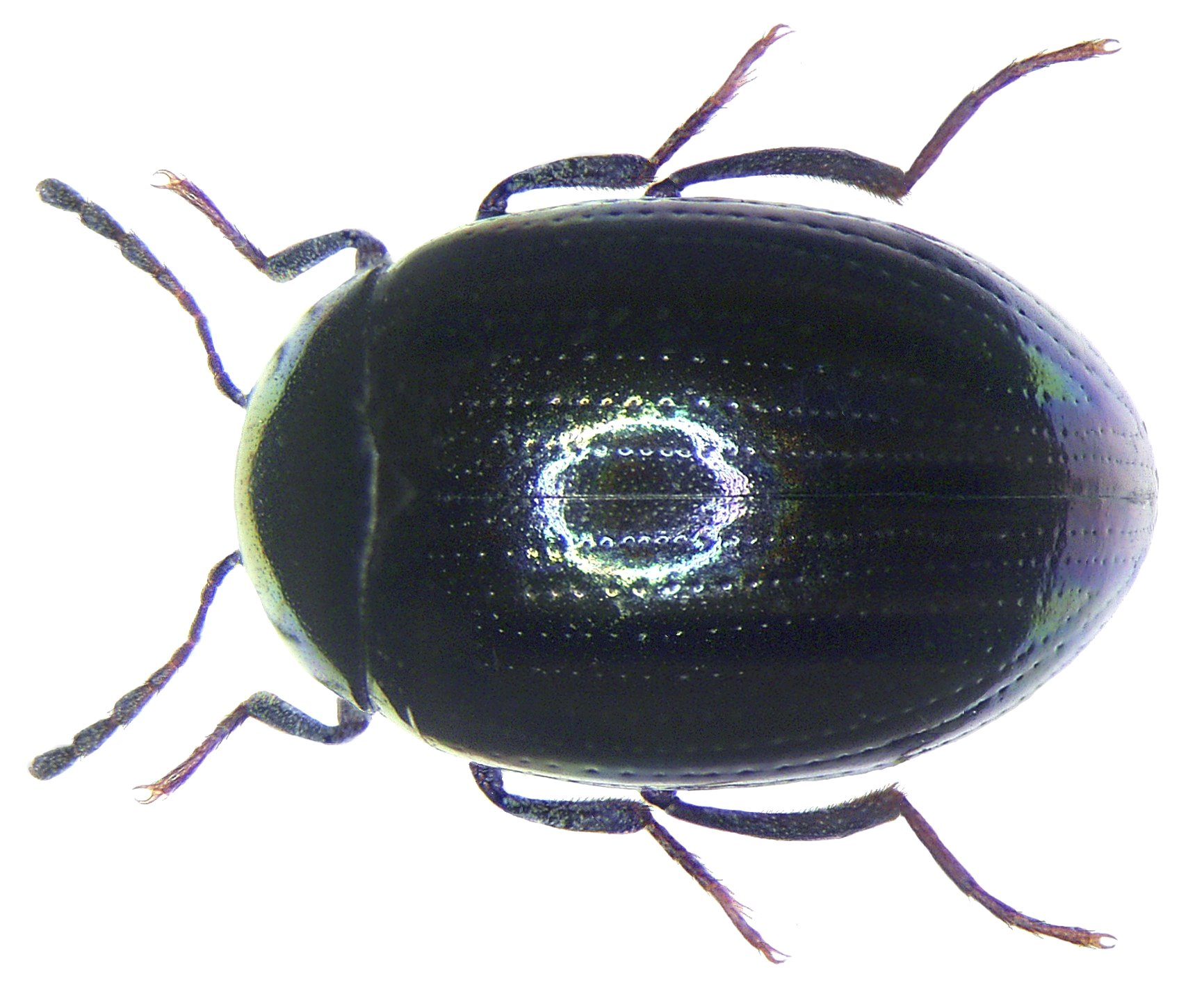
Amarygmus splendidulus

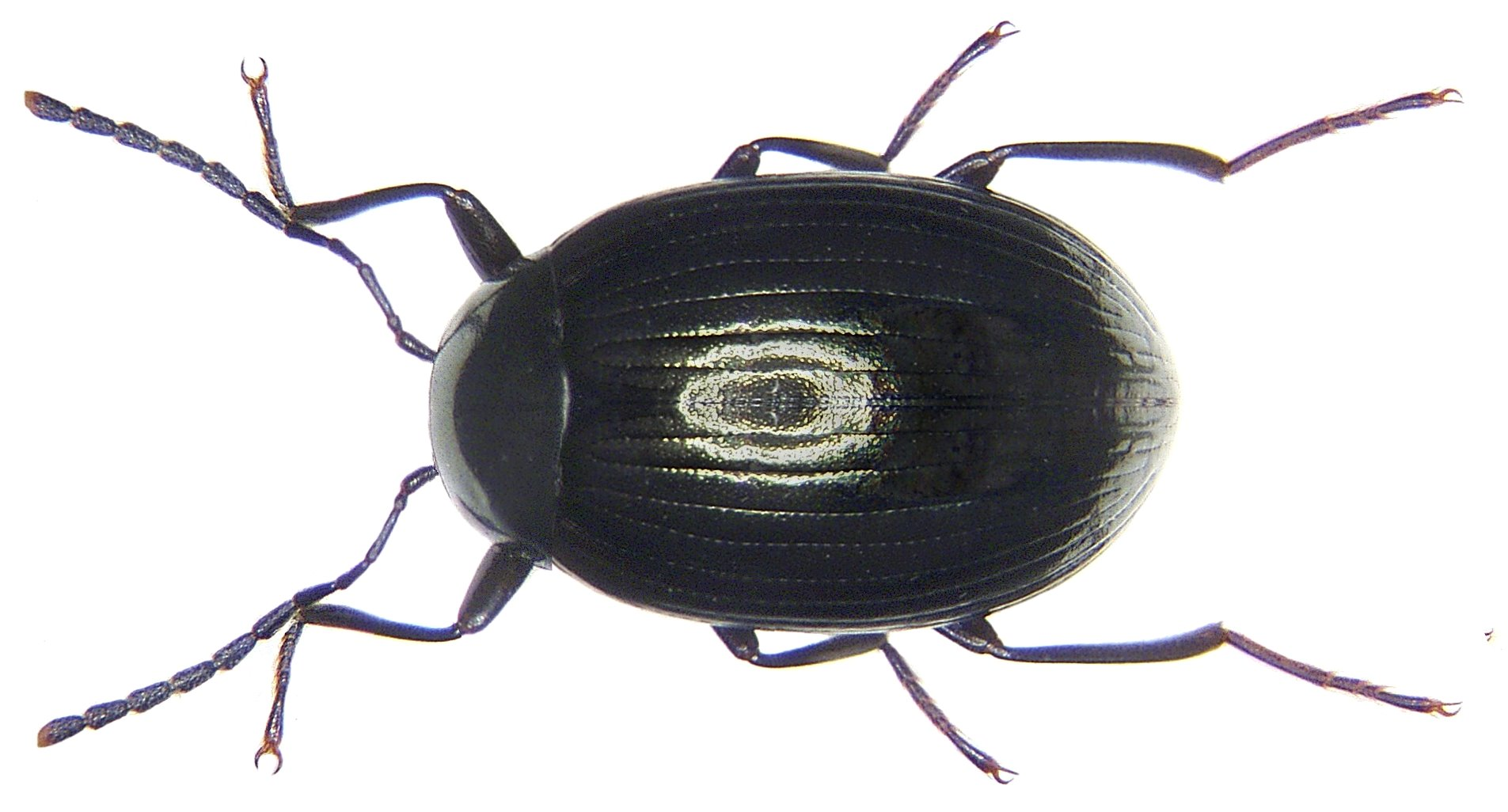
Amarygmus toliensis

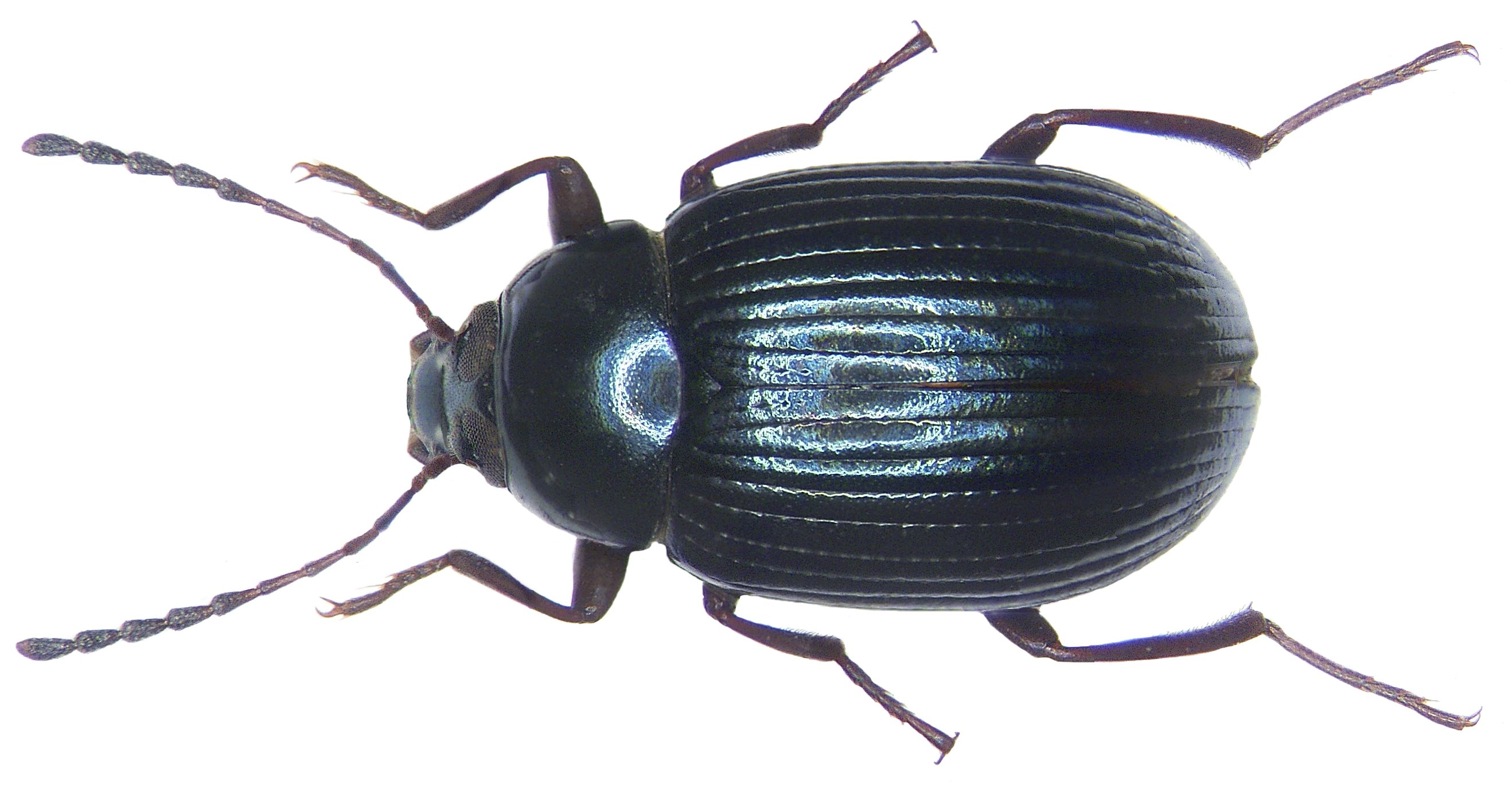
Amarygmus venetus
