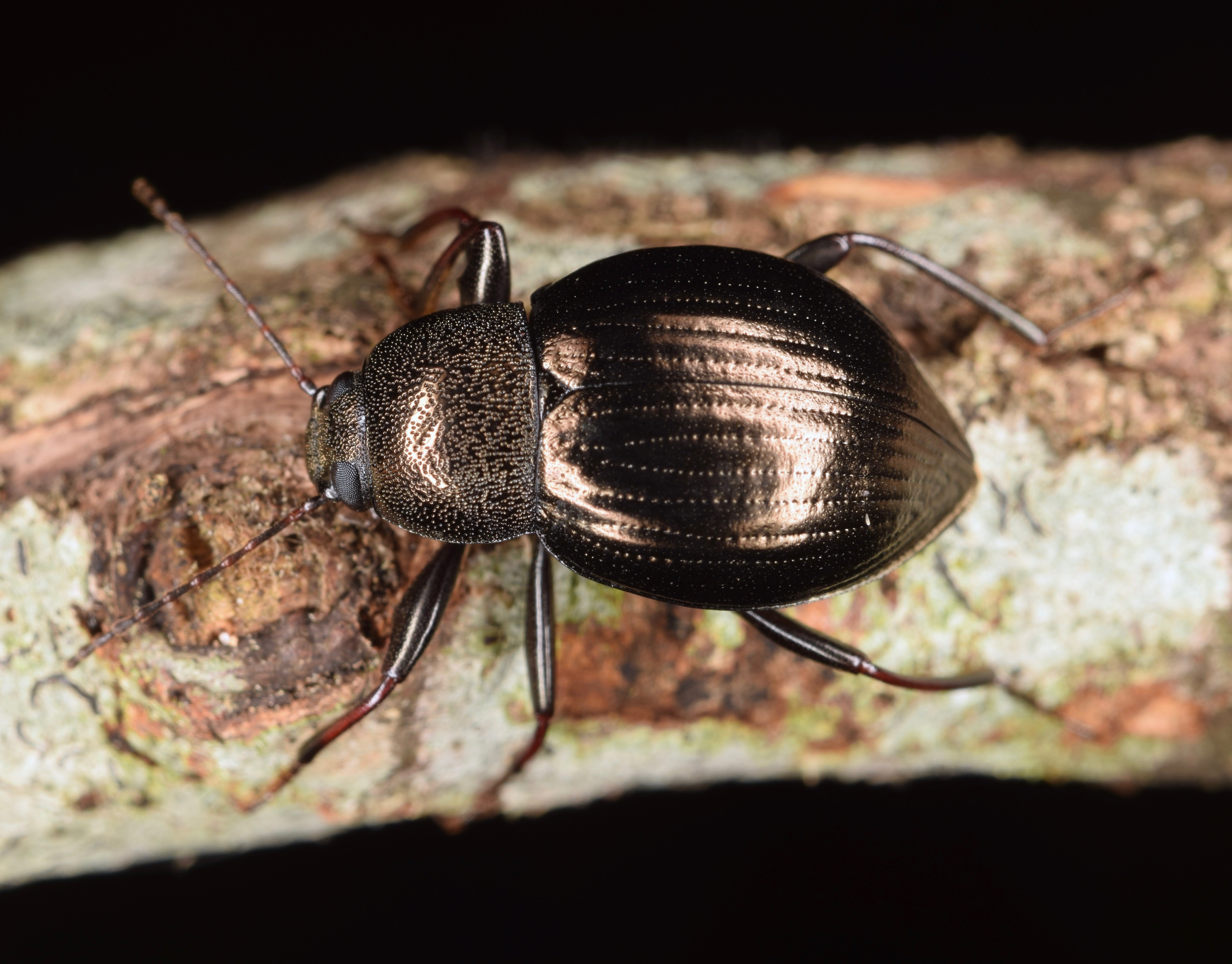

Scientific classification
- Domain: Eukaryota
- Kingdom: Animalia
- Phylum: Arthropoda
- Class: Insecta
- Order: Coleoptera
- Suborder: Polyphaga
- Infraorder: Cucujiformia
- Family: Tenebrionidae
- Genus: Meracantha
- Species: M. contracta

Binomial name
- Meracantha contracta (Palisot de Beauvois, 1812)

= Meracantha contracta =

Species of beetle

Meracantha contracta is a species of darkling beetle found in North America.

== Description ==
Adult M. contracta are 11-14 mm in length. The pronotum is large, the abdomen and its overlying elytra are very convex (resulting in a humped appearance), and both pronotum and elytra are covered in punctures. The colour is bronze-black, though newly emerged adults are creamy-white and gradually darken until they take on the mature colour.

Larvae are elongate, cylindrical and reddish-brown. They are notable for the shape of the ninth abdominal segment, which is obliquely truncate (ending abruptly). The truncate surface is strongly concave and has acute margins. This is unique among larvae of North American darkling beetles.

Pupae are about 15 mm long. They are mostly cream-coloured with the head and legs darker but become much more strongly coloured just before emergence. The first five abdominal segments have a two-lobed protuberance on each side, while the eighth and final segment ends in two diverging points.

== Life cycle ==
Like other beetles, M. contracta goes through the four stages of egg, larva, pupa and adult.

This species overwinters in the larval stage and inside rotting logs. To help survive cold temperatures, it produces macromolecular antifreeze similar to that of cold water-dwelling fishes. This antifreeze lets larvae survive temperatures down to approximately -11 °C.

The pupal stage lasts for 10-14 days.

Adults live for a few months.

== Habitat ==
This beetle occurs under bark and on dead stumps of trees, typically those that have lichens and moss.

== Diet ==
One source states that M. contracta feeds on arboreal lichens, while another source describes it as a bark-eater.

In captivity, larvae of this species have been reared on a diet of chick feed with a small amount of leaf litter.

== Parasitoids ==
Pupae of M. contracta are parasitised by the bombyllid fly Villa alternata (=Anthrax alternata), while larvae are parasitised by tachinid flies of genus Pales (=Neopales).
