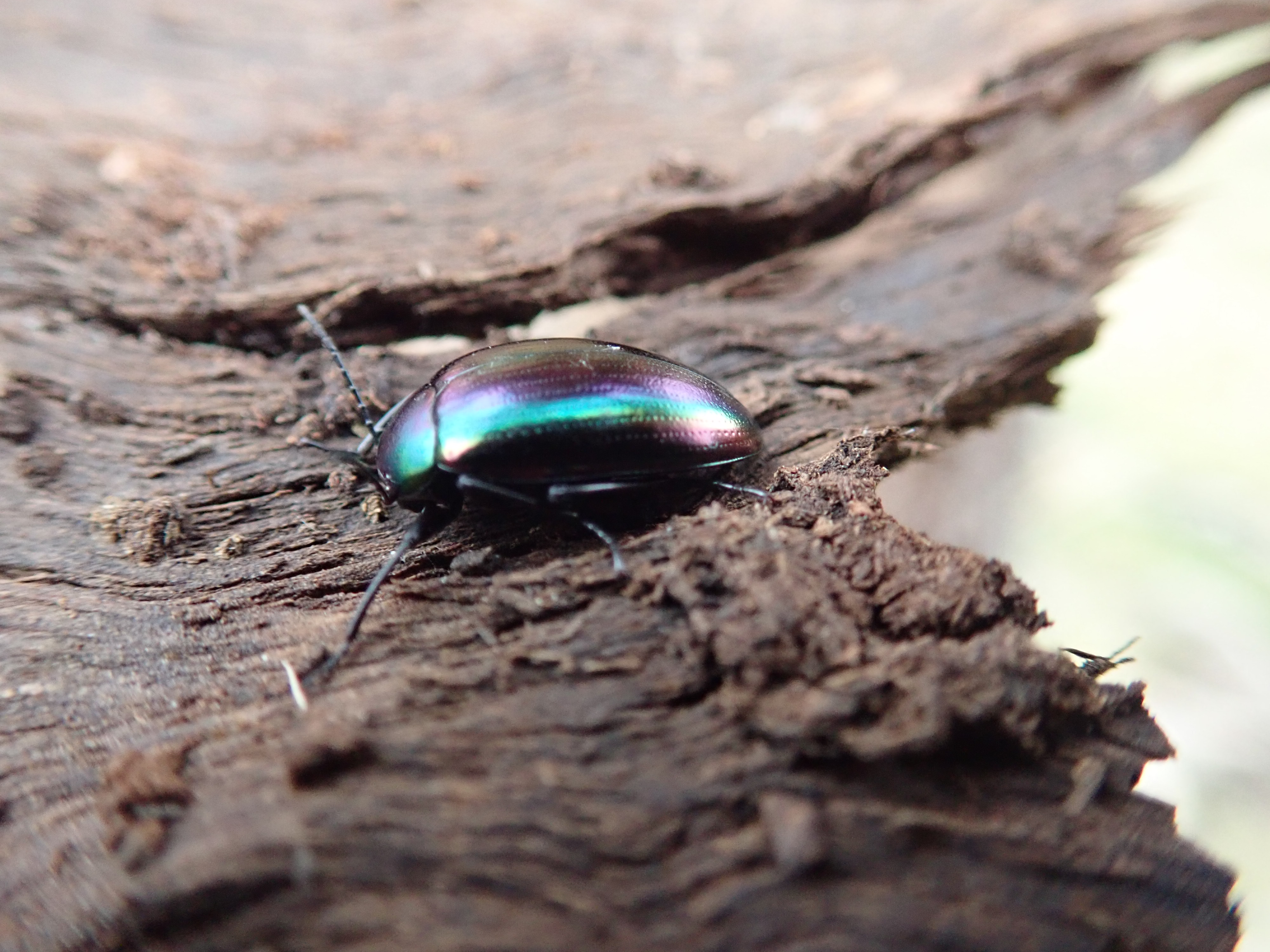

Scientific classification
- Kingdom: Animalia
- Phylum: Arthropoda
- Class: Insecta
- Order: Coleoptera
- Suborder: Polyphaga
- Infraorder: Cucujiformia
- Family: Tenebrionidae
- Subfamily: Tenebrioninae
- Genus: Chalcopteroides; Strand, 1935

Species
- See text

= Chalcopteroides =

Genus of beetles

Chalcopteroides is a genus of darkling beetle, defined by Embrik Strand in 1935, and replacing the older name Chalcopterus which was preoccupied. The type species is Chalcopterus iridicolor. The genus occurs throughout Australia.

== Description ==
Chalcopteroides range from 6 to 23 mm in length. They are oblong in shape, glabrous and usually a metallic blue or green colour. The mandibles lack a sulcus and have either truncate or rounded apices. The lateral margins of the pronotum are complete. The elytra usually have only superficial and minute punctures (sometimes they have impressed striae). The metaventrite is long. The tarsal vestiture (hairs on the tarsi) is mostly black.

== Ecology ==
Some Chalcopteroides are known to live in soil. Additionally, arthropod fragments have been found in guts of some species, suggesting a scavenging or predatory lifestyle.

== Species ==
Below are the species of this genus:

- Chalcopteroides acutangulus (Blackburn, 1899)
- Chalcopteroides amethystinus (Fabricius, 1775)
- Chalcopteroides angusticollis (Carter, 1913)
- Chalcopteroides bellus (Blackburn, 1893)
- Chalcopteroides bovilli (Blackburn, 1893)
- Chalcopteroides brevipes (Blackburn, 1893)
- Chalcopteroides caesar (Carter, 1913)
- Chalcopteroides carinaticeps (Blackburn, 1893)
- Chalcopteroides carus (Blackburn, 1893)
- Chalcopteroides catenulatus (Blackburn, 1893)
- Chalcopteroides clypealis (Blackburn, 1893)
- Chalcopteroides colossus (Blackburn, 1893)
- Chalcopteroides columbinus (Boisduval, 1835)
- Chalcopteroides costatus (Blackburn, 1899)
- Chalcopteroides cribratus (Blackburn, 1901)
- Chalcopteroides croesus (Blackburn, 1899)
- Chalcopteroides cupreus (Fabricius, 1775)
- Chalcopteroides cupripennis (Hope, 1843)
- Chalcopteroides cyaneus (Carter, 1913)
- Chalcopteroides cyaniventris (Carter, 1913)
- Chalcopteroides cyanopterus (Hope, 1831)
- Chalcopteroides cylindricus (Blackburn, 1893)
- Chalcopteroides difficilis (Blackburn, 1892)
- Chalcopteroides doddi (Carter, 1913)
- Chalcopteroides elongatus (Carter, 1913)
- Chalcopteroides eremita (Blackburn, 1892)
- Chalcopteroides exoletus (Blackburn, 1893)
- Chalcopteroides eyrensis (Blackburn, 1893)
- Chalcopteroides fastuosus (Germar, 1848)
- Chalcopteroides fervens (Germar, 1848)
- Chalcopteroides gilesi (Carter, 1913)
- Chalcopteroides gracilicornis (Blackburn, 1899)
- Chalcopteroides gracilior (Blackburn, 1893)
- Chalcopteroides grandis (Macleay, 1872)
- Chalcopteroides imperialis (Blackburn, 1893)
- Chalcopteroides inconspicuus (Blackburn, 1893)
- Chalcopteroides interioris (Blackburn, 1890)
- Chalcopteroides intermedius (Blackburn, 1893)
- Chalcopteroides interrogationis (Gebien, 1908)
- Chalcopteroides iridescens (Carter, 1913)
- Chalcopteroides iridicolor (Blessig, 1861)
- Chalcopteroides iridiventris (Blackburn, 1893)
- Chalcopteroides iris (Blackburn, 1899)
- Chalcopteroides juvenis (Blackburn, 1893)
- Chalcopteroides kochi (Blackburn, 1900)
- Chalcopteroides laetus (Blackburn, 1893)
- Chalcopteroides latifrons (Carter, 1913)
- Chalcopteroides leai (Blackburn, 1893)
- Chalcopteroides lepidus (Blackburn, 1893)
- Chalcopteroides longipennis (Hope, 1843)
- Chalcopteroides longiusculus (Blackburn, 1889)
- Chalcopteroides longulus (Blackburn, 1893)
- Chalcopteroides lucidus (Carter, 1924)
- Chalcopteroides macer (Blackburn, 1893)
- Chalcopteroides major (Blackburn, 1893)
- Chalcopteroides mastersi (Blackburn, 1893)
- Chalcopteroides maximus (Carter, 1913)
- Chalcopteroides mercurius (Blackburn, 1893)
- Chalcopteroides micans (Blackburn, 1893)
- Chalcopteroides michaelseni (Gebien, 1908)
- Chalcopteroides mimus (Blackburn, 1893)
- Chalcopteroides minor (Blackburn, 1893)
- Chalcopteroides modestus (Blackburn, 1893)
- Chalcopteroides mundus (Blackburn, 1899)
- Chalcopteroides murrayensis (Blackburn, 1893)
- Chalcopteroides neglectus (Blackburn, 1893)
- Chalcopteroides nigritarsis (Pascoe, 1866)
- Chalcopteroides nitidus (Carter, 1930)
- Chalcopteroides nobilis (Blackburn, 1893)
- Chalcopteroides oblongus (Blackburn, 1893)
- Chalcopteroides obscurus (Blackburn, 1893)
- Chalcopteroides ocularis (Blackburn, 1893)
- Chalcopteroides opacicollis (Macleay, 1872)
- Chalcopteroides palmerensis (Blackburn, 1893)
- Chalcopteroides palmerstoni (Blackburn, 1893)
- Chalcopteroides parallelocollis (Gebien, 1908)
- Chalcopteroides perlongus (Blackburn, 1893)
- Chalcopteroides picipes (Macleay, 1872)
- Chalcopteroides placidus (Blackburn, 1893)
- Chalcopteroides plutus (Blackburn, 1893)
- Chalcopteroides polychromus (Pascoe, 1869)
- Chalcopteroides praetermissus (Carter, 1924)
- Chalcopteroides prismaticus (Carter, 1913)
- Chalcopteroides proditor (Blackburn, 1899)
- Chalcopteroides prospiciens (Blackburn, 1893)
- Chalcopteroides proximus (Blackburn, 1893)
- Chalcopteroides pulcher (Blackburn, 1893)
- Chalcopteroides puncticollis (Hope, 1843)
- Chalcopteroides punctipennis (Macleay, 1872)
- Chalcopteroides punctulatus (Blackburn, 1893)
- Chalcopteroides purpureus (Germar, 1848)
- Chalcopteroides rugosicollis (Macleay, 1872)
- Chalcopteroides rugosipennis (Macleay, 1872)
- Chalcopteroides scutellaris (Carter, 1921)
- Chalcopteroides segnis (Blackburn, 1893)
- Chalcopteroides semiseriatus (Blackburn, 1893)
- Chalcopteroides sericatus (Carter, 1913)
- Chalcopteroides setosus (Blackburn, 1893)
- Chalcopteroides setuliger (Gebien, 1920)
- Chalcopteroides smaragdulus (Fabricius, 1775)
- Chalcopteroides sparsus (Blackburn, 1893)
- Chalcopteroides spectabilis (Castelnau & Brullé, 1831)
- Chalcopteroides sulcipennis (Hope, 1843)
- Chalcopteroides superbus (Blackburn, 1890)
- Chalcopteroides tenuicornis (Gebien, 1908)
- Chalcopteroides tinctus (Blackburn, 1893)
- Chalcopteroides torpedo (Carter, 1921)
- Chalcopteroides tristis (Fabricius, 1798)
- Chalcopteroides velutinus (Macleay, 1826)
- Chalcopteroides versicolor (Blackburn, 1893)
- Chalcopteroides viridicollis (Macleay, 1826)
- Chalcopteroides vividus (Blackburn, 1893)
- Chalcopteroides yorkensis (Blackburn, 1893)
- Chalcopteroides zonatus (Blackburn, 1899)

== Gallery ==
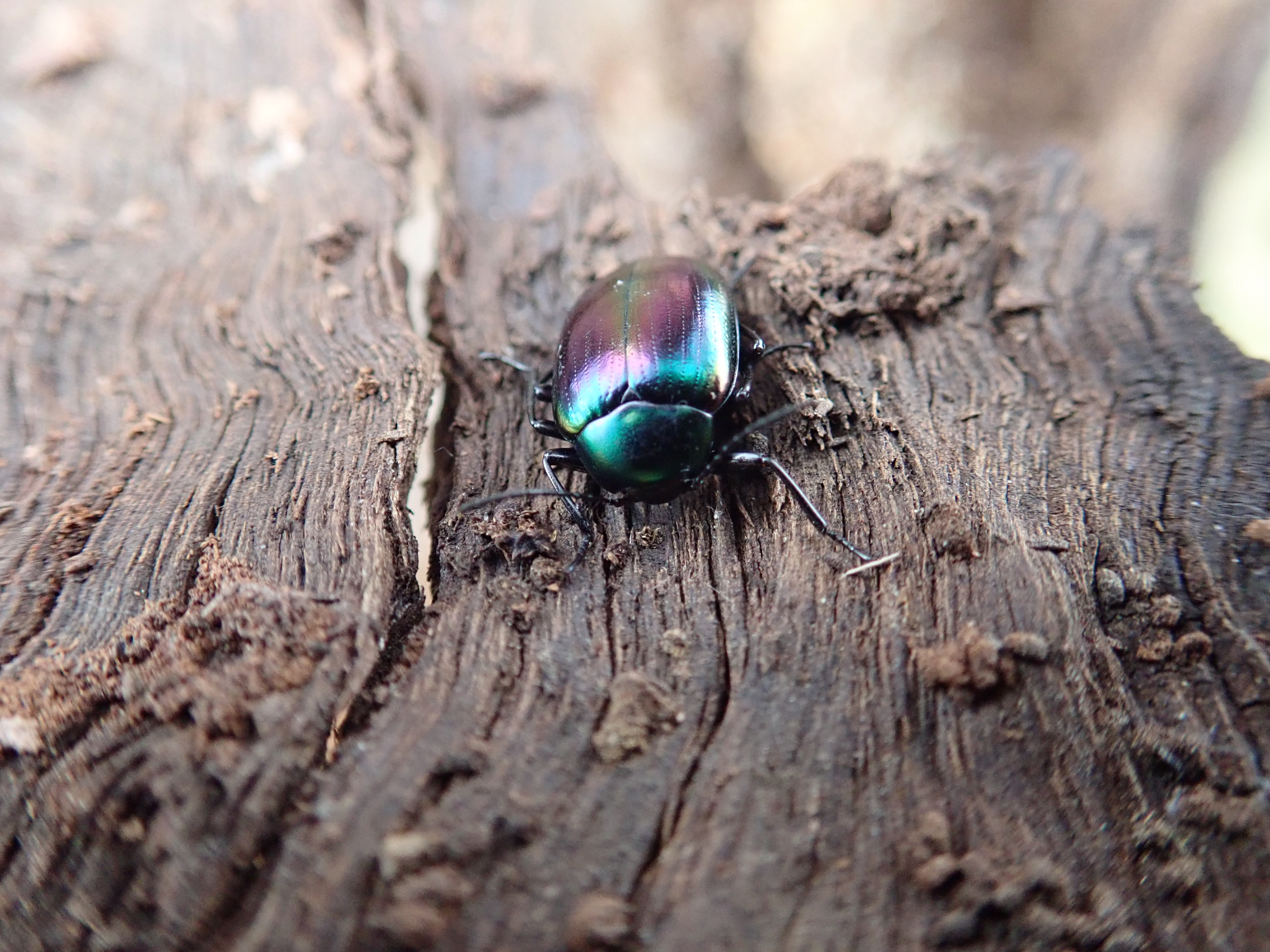

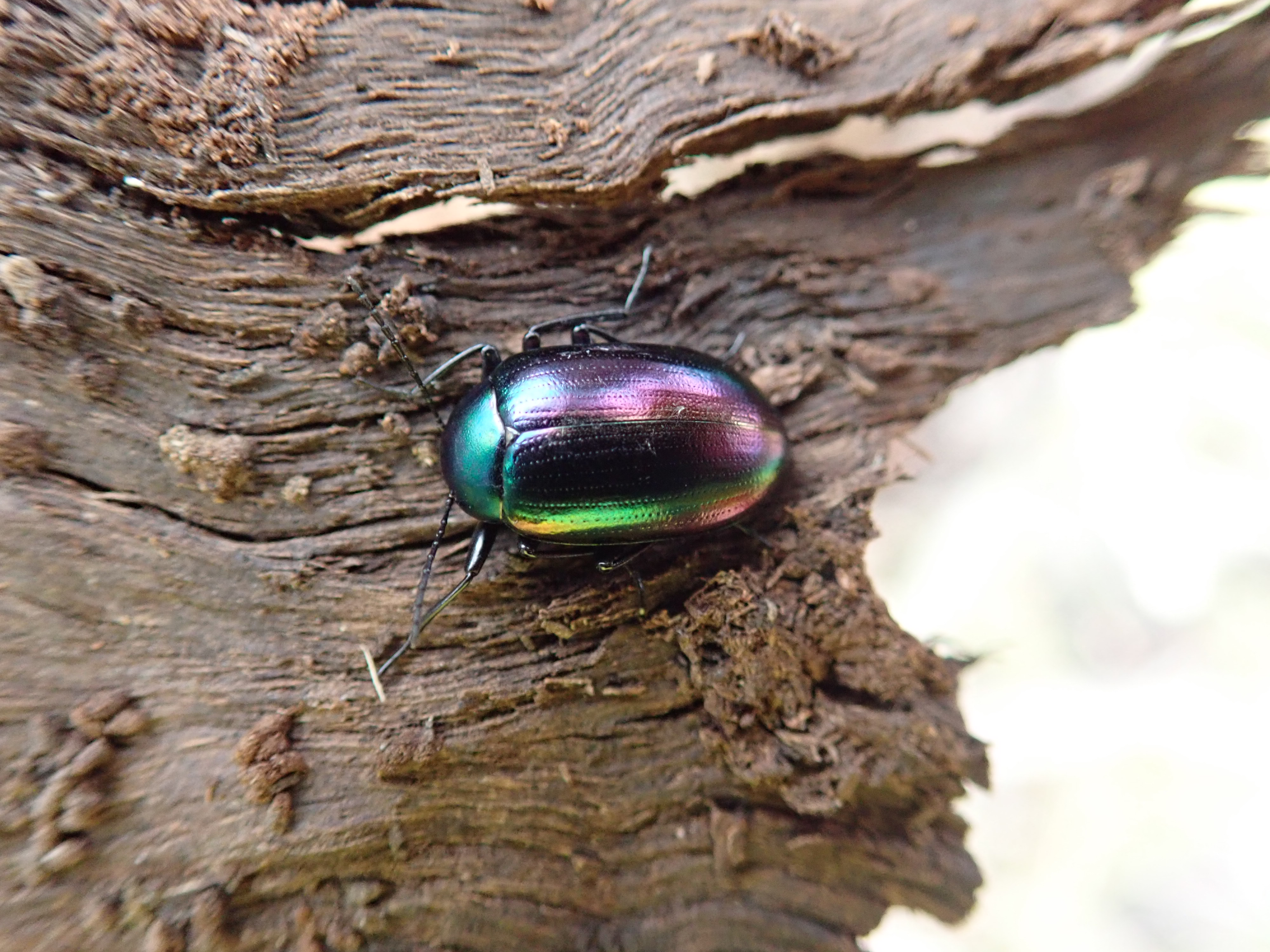
