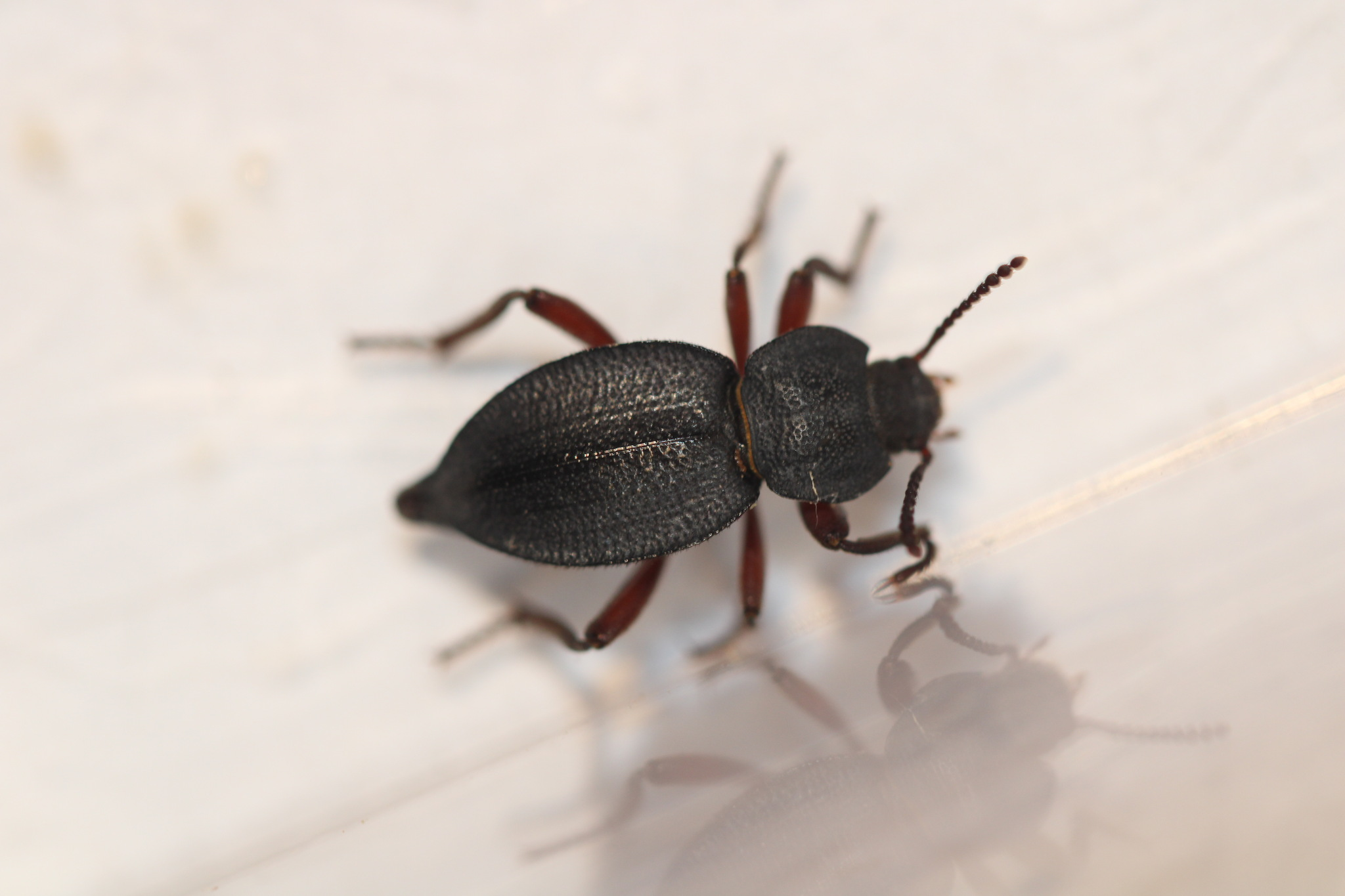

Scientific classification
- Kingdom: Animalia
- Phylum: Arthropoda
- Class: Insecta
- Order: Coleoptera
- Suborder: Polyphaga
- Infraorder: Cucujiformia
- Family: Tenebrionidae
- Genus: Embaphion
- Species: E. depressum

Binomial name
- Embaphion depressum (LeConte, 1851)

= Embaphion depressum =

Species of beetle

Embaphion depressum is a species of beetle in the family Tenebrionidae.
