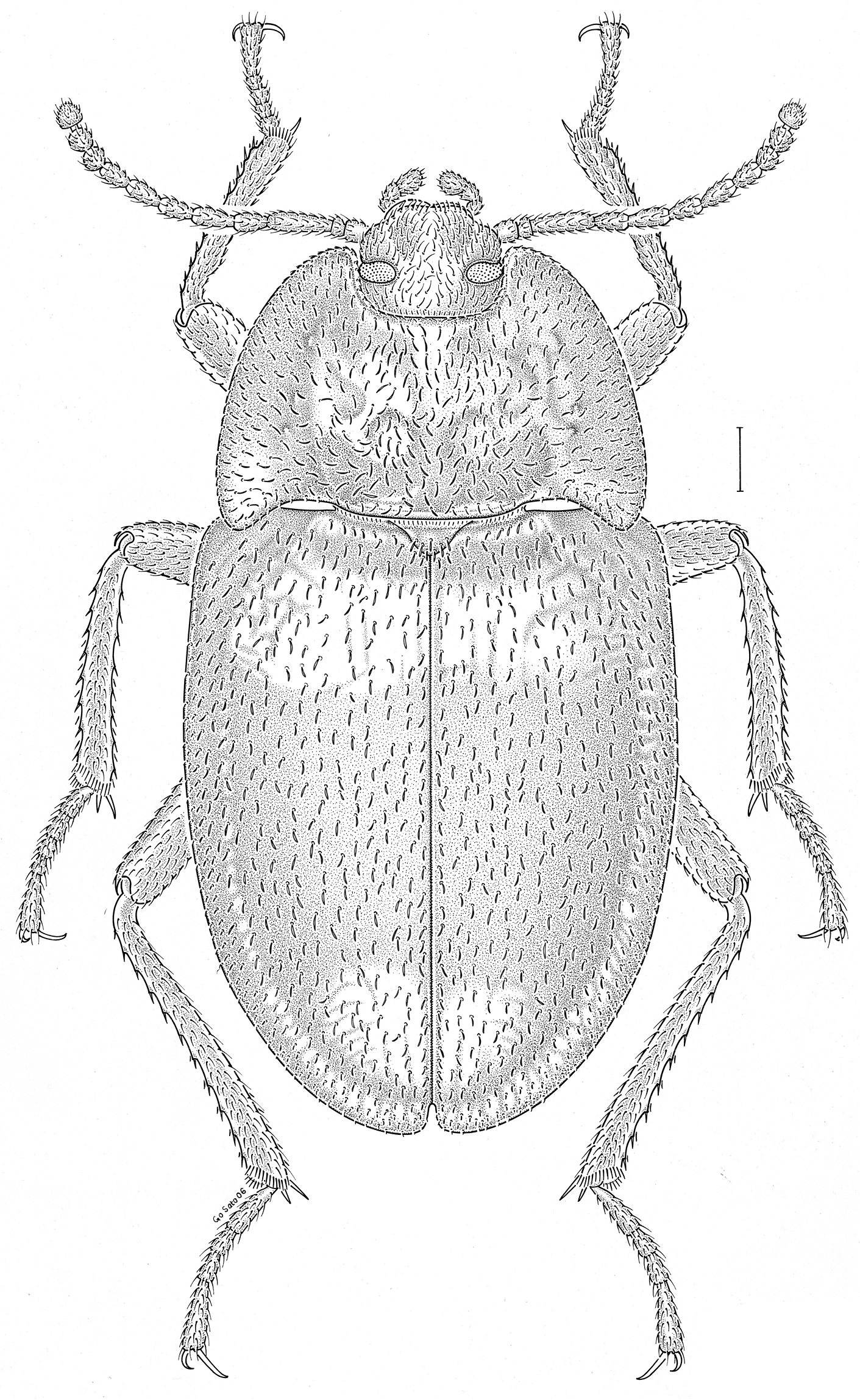

Scientific classification
- Kingdom: Animalia
- Phylum: Arthropoda
- Class: Insecta
- Order: Coleoptera
- Suborder: Polyphaga
- Infraorder: Cucujiformia
- Family: Tenebrionidae
- Genus: Embaphion
- Species: E. muricatum

Binomial name
- Embaphion muricatum (Say, 1824)

= Embaphion muricatum =

Species of beetle

Embaphion muricatum is a species of beetle in the family Tenebrionidae.
