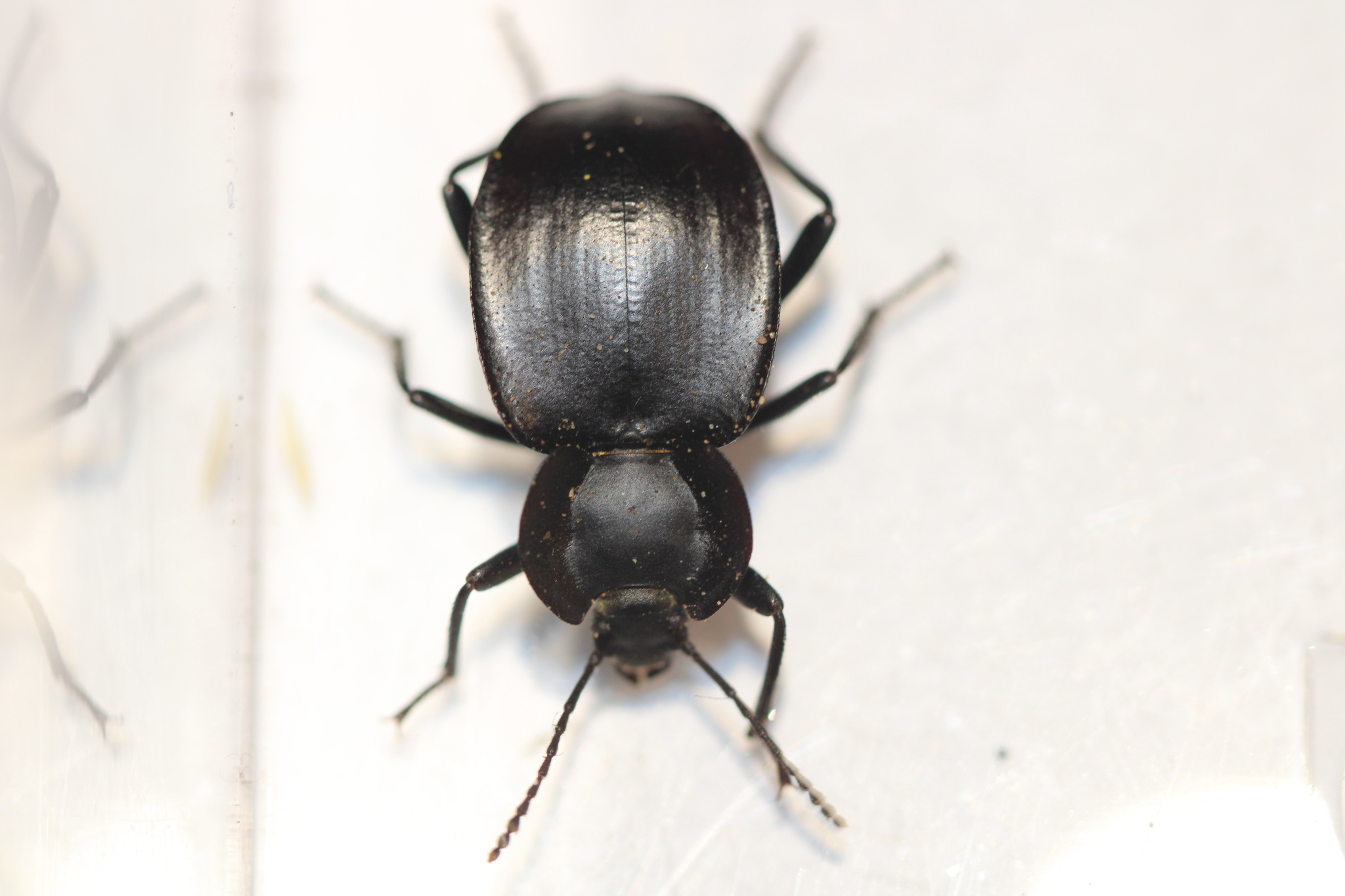

Scientific classification
- Kingdom: Animalia
- Phylum: Arthropoda
- Class: Insecta
- Order: Coleoptera
- Suborder: Polyphaga
- Infraorder: Cucujiformia
- Family: Tenebrionidae
- Genus: Embaphion
- Species: E. glabrum

Binomial name
- Embaphion glabrum Blaisdell, 1909

= Embaphion glabrum =

Species of beetle

Embaphion glabrum is a species of beetle in the family Tenebrionidae.
