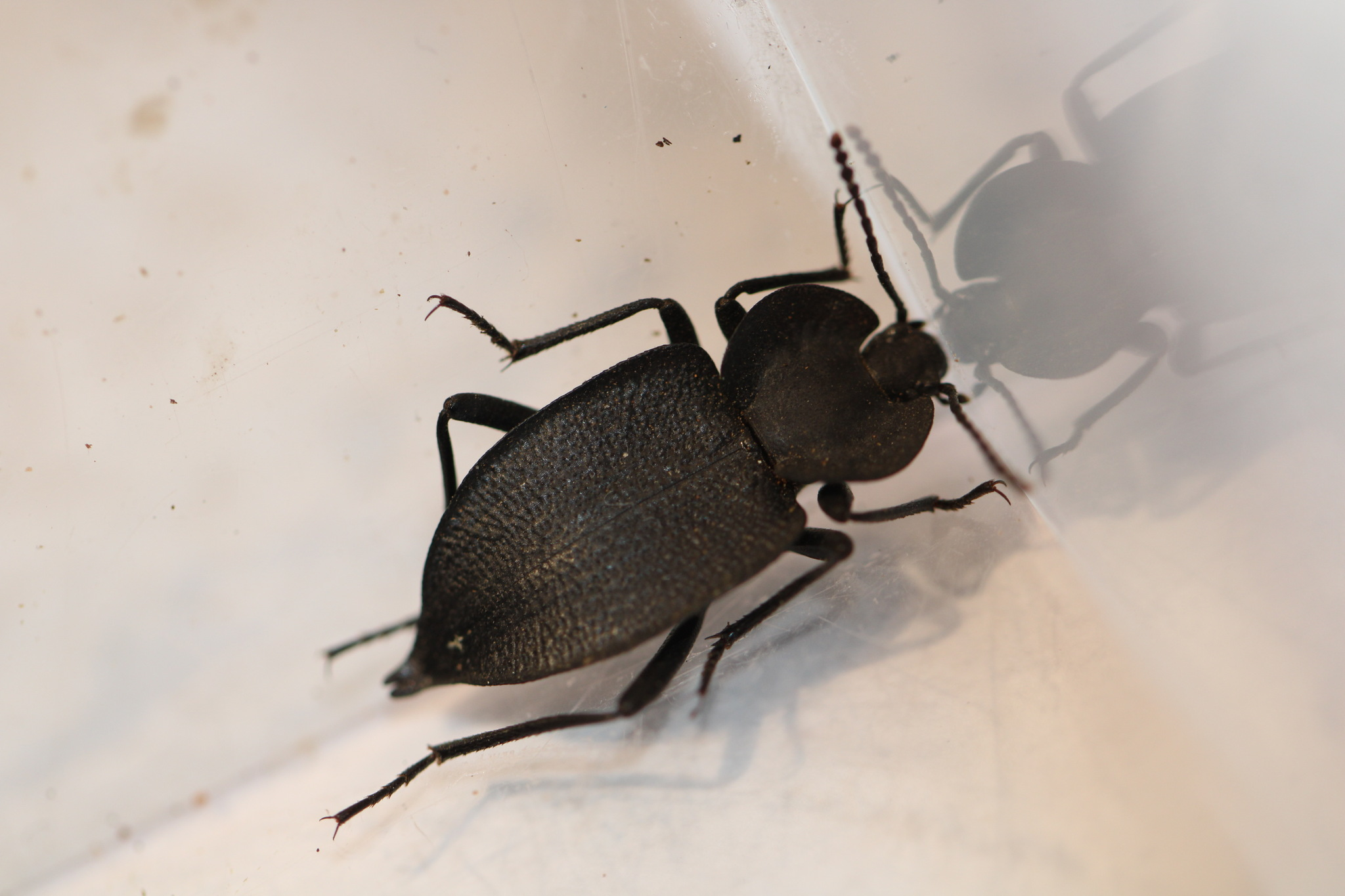

Scientific classification
- Kingdom: Animalia
- Phylum: Arthropoda
- Class: Insecta
- Order: Coleoptera
- Suborder: Polyphaga
- Infraorder: Cucujiformia
- Family: Tenebrionidae
- Genus: Embaphion
- Species: E. contusum

Binomial name
- Embaphion contusum LeConte, 1858

= Embaphion contusum =

Species of beetle

Embaphion contusum is a species of beetle in the family Tenebrionidae.

== Taxonomy ==
Embaphion contusum contains the following subspecies:

- Embaphion contusum laminatum Casey, 1890
- Embaphion contusum contusum LeConte, 1858
- Embaphion contusum grande Blaisdell, 1909
