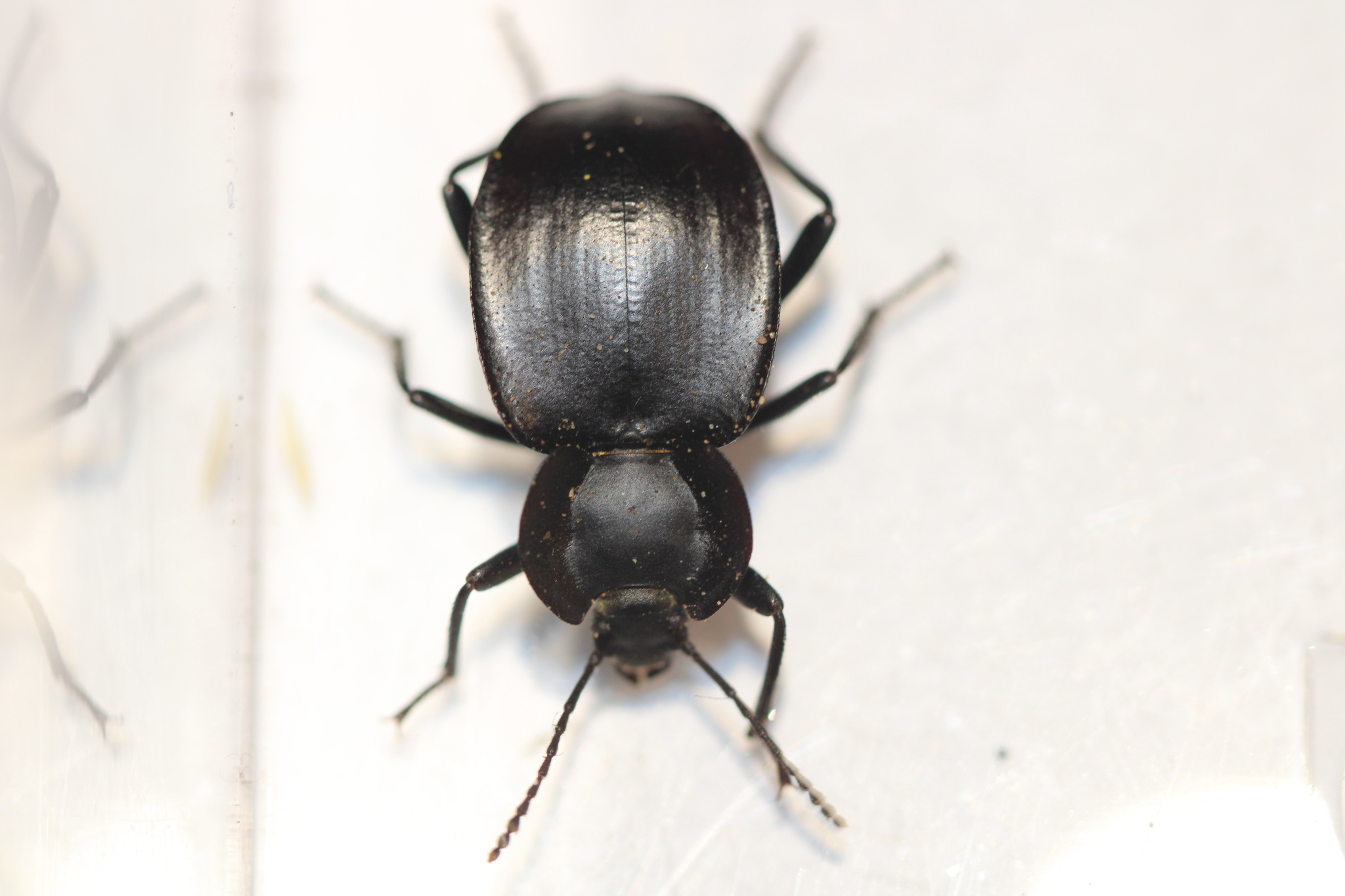

Scientific classification
- Domain: Eukaryota
- Kingdom: Animalia
- Phylum: Arthropoda
- Class: Insecta
- Order: Coleoptera
- Suborder: Polyphaga
- Infraorder: Cucujiformia
- Family: Tenebrionidae
- Subfamily: Blaptinae
- Tribe: Amphidorini
- Genus: Embaphion; Say, 1824

Type species
- Embaphion muricatum (Say, 1824)

= Embaphion =

Genus of beetles

Embaphion is a genus of beetles in the family Tenebrionidae.

== Taxonomy ==
Embaphion contains the following species:

- Embaphion elongatum Horn, 1870
- Embaphion planum Horn, 1870
- Embaphion depressum (LeConte, 1851)
- Embaphion mexicanum Blaisdell, 1935
- Embaphion muricatum (Say, 1824)
- Embaphion contractum Blaisdell, 1909
- Embaphion contusum LeConte, 1858
- Embaphion glabrum Blaisdell, 1909
