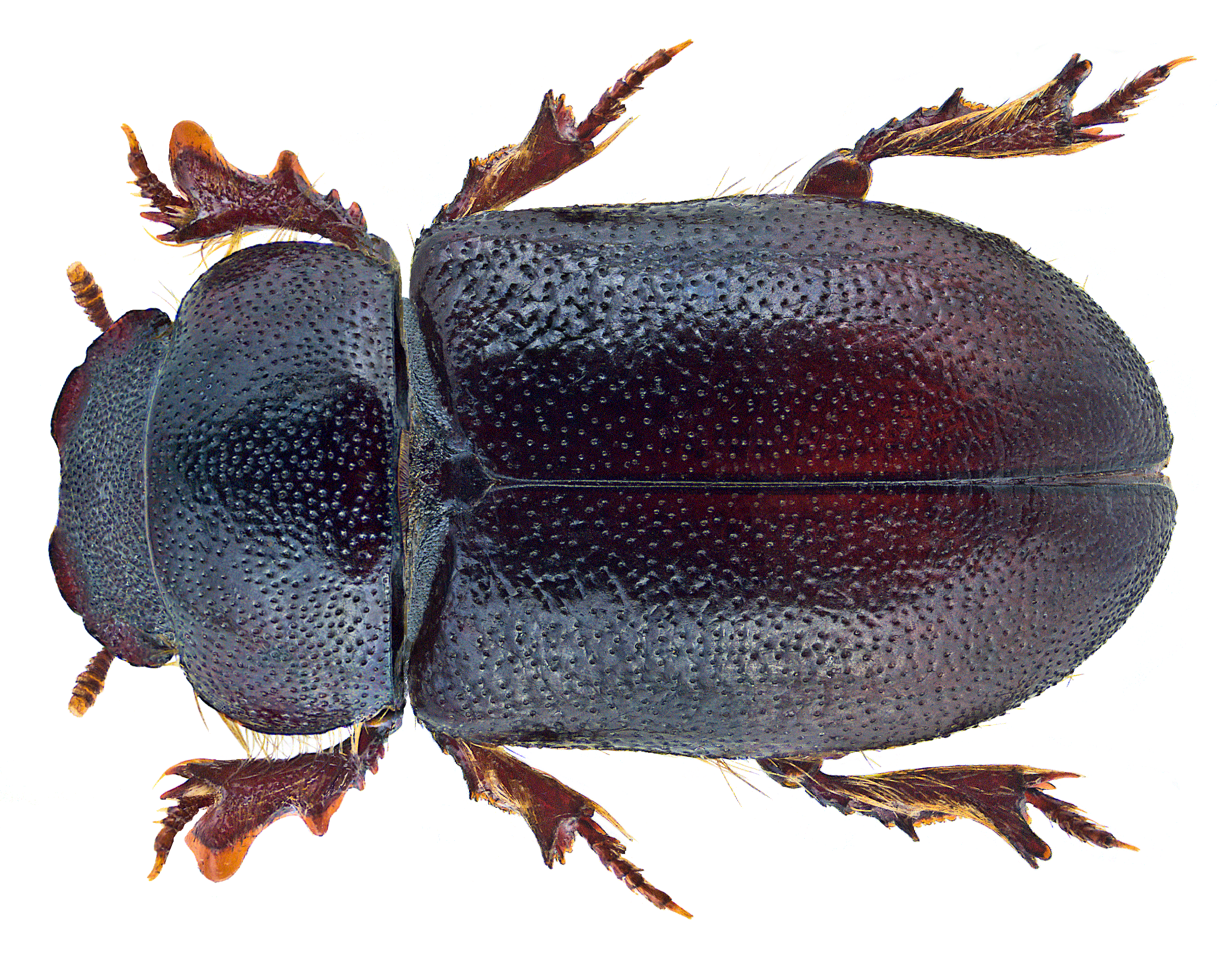
- Cheirodes

Scientific classification
- Domain: Eukaryota
- Kingdom: Animalia
- Phylum: Arthropoda
- Class: Insecta
- Order: Coleoptera
- Suborder: Polyphaga
- Infraorder: Cucujiformia
- Family: Tenebrionidae
- Subfamily: Tenebrioninae
- Tribe: Melanimonini; Seidlitz, 1894 (1854)

= Melanimonini =

Tribe of beetles

Melanimonini is a tribe of darkling beetles in the family Tenebrionidae. There are at least three genera in Melanimonini.

== Genera ==
These genera belong to the tribe Melanimonini:

- Cheirodes Gené, 1839 (North America, the Palearctic, tropical Africa, and Australasia)
- Dolamara Reichardt, 1935 (the Palearctic)
- Melanimon Steven, 1828 (the Palearctic)

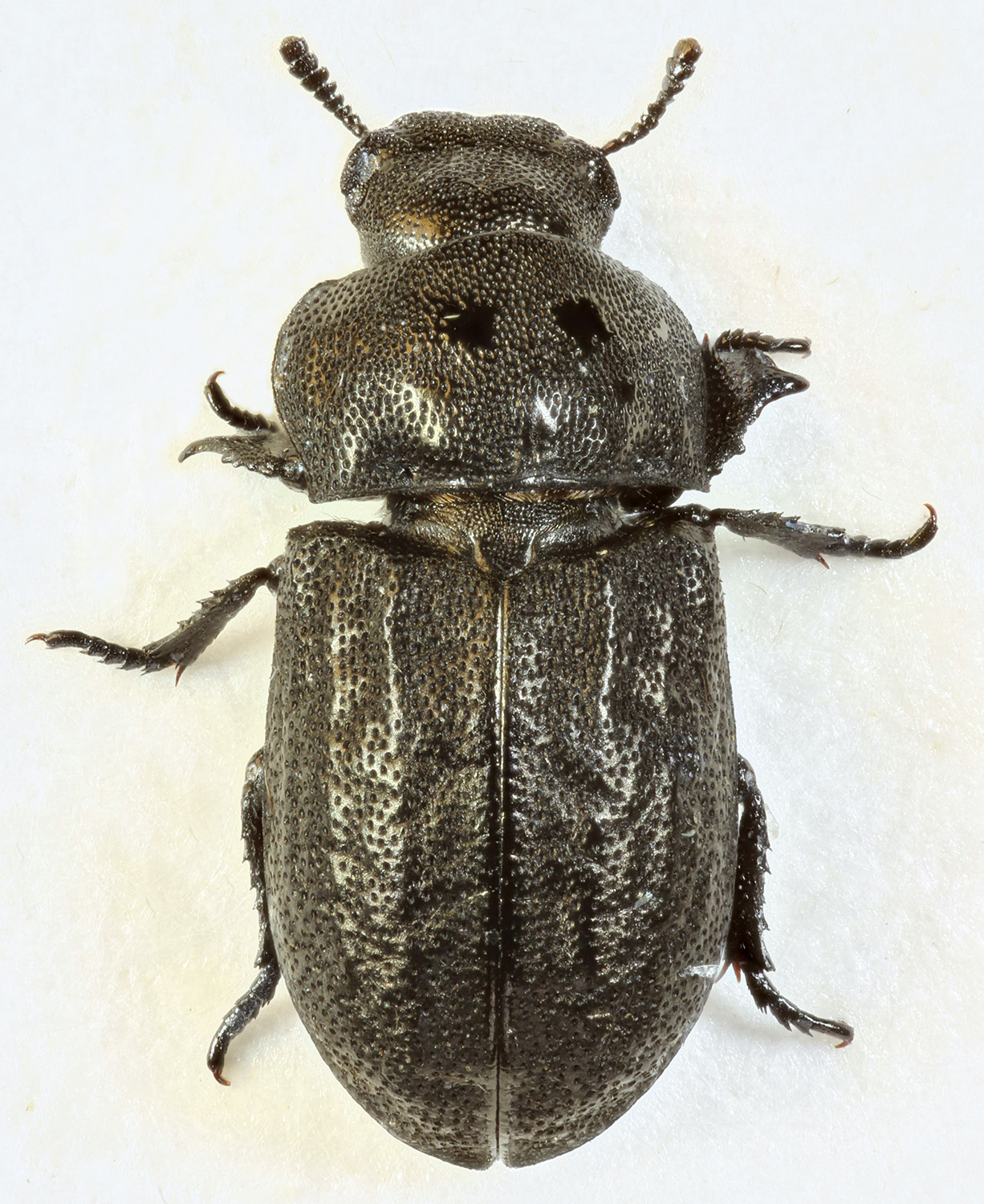
Melanimon tibiale, Dinlle, North Wales
