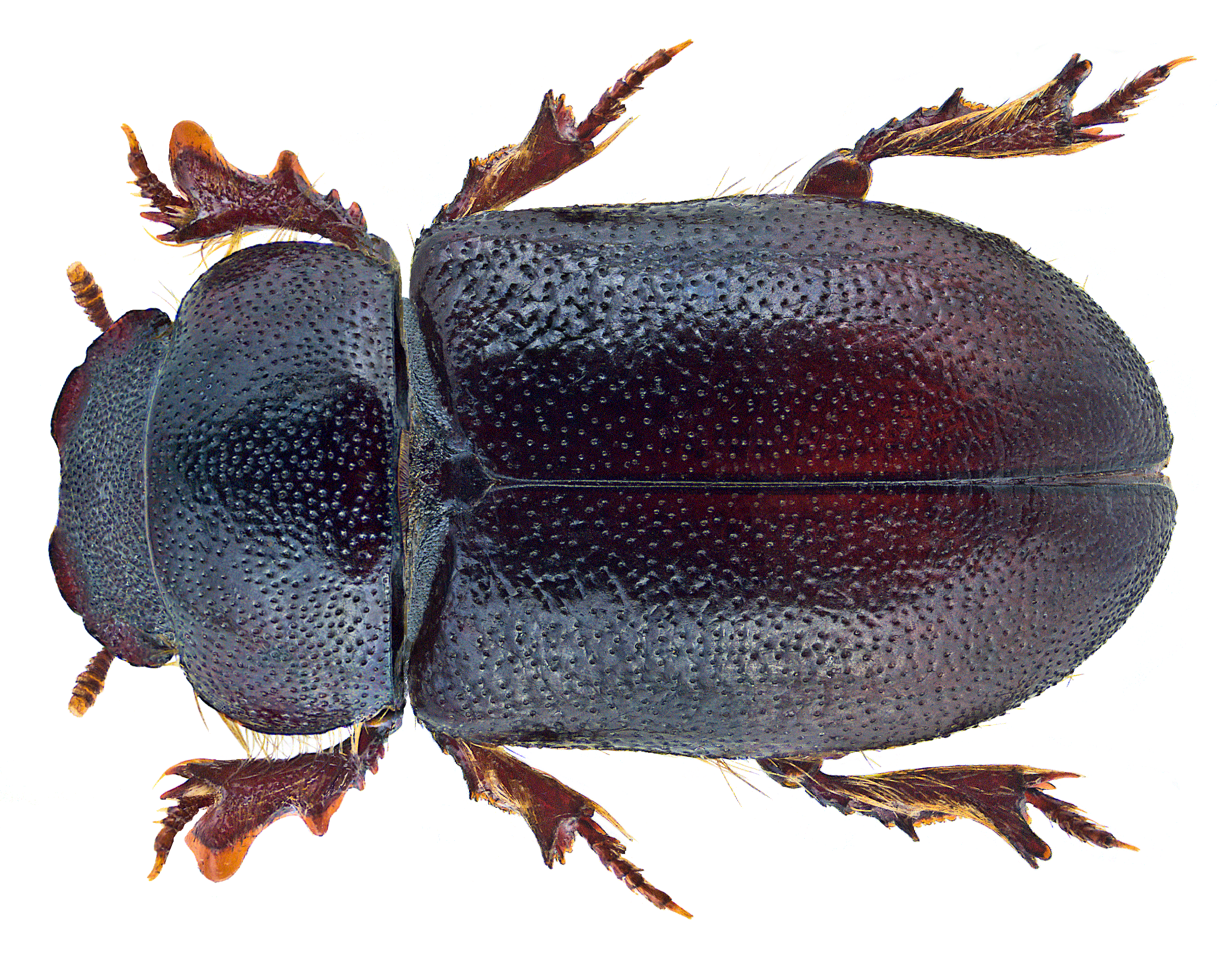
- Cheirodes dentipes

Scientific classification
- Domain: Eukaryota
- Kingdom: Animalia
- Phylum: Arthropoda
- Class: Insecta
- Order: Coleoptera
- Suborder: Polyphaga
- Infraorder: Cucujiformia
- Family: Tenebrionidae
- Subfamily: Tenebrioninae
- Genus: Cheirodes; Géné, 1839

Type species
- Cheirodes sardous Géné, 1839

Species
- See Text

Synonyms
- Anemia Laporte de Castelnau, 1840; Chirodes Agassiz, 1846

= Cheirodes =

Genus of beetles

Cheirodes is a genus of darkling beetles in the Melanimonini tribe. It was formerly known as Anemia until 1973, when T. J. Spilman determined Anemia to be a synonym of Cheirodes Géné, 1839.

== Subgenera ==
Cheirodes is split into several subgenera:

- Cheirodes Géné, 1839
- Anemiadena Ardoin, 1971
- Histiaea Fairmaire, 1892
- Pseudanemia Wollaston, 1864
- Spinanemia Ardoin, 1971
- Trichanemia Ardoin, 1971

Ammidanemia Reitter, 1904 is partly synonymous with Histiaea Fairmaire, 1892 and Pseudanemia Wollaston, 1864.

== Species ==
Among the species within this genus are:

- Subgenus Cheirodes Géné, 1839
  - C. aethiopea (Ardoin, 1971) (Synonym: Anemia aethiopea Ardoin, 1971)
  - C. chobauti (Reitter, 1898) (Synonyms: Anemia rotundicollis Reitter, 1884, Anemia reitteri Pic, 1899, Anemia chobauti (Reitter, 1898))
  - C. durandi (Ardoin, 1971) (Synonym: Anemia durandi Ardoin, 1971)
  - C. granulatus (Laporte, 1840) (Synonyms: Anemia crassa Wollaston, 1867, Anemia granulata Laporte, 1840)
  - C. gruveli (Ardoin, 1971) (Synonym: Anemia gruveli Ardoin, 1971)
  - C. humeralis (Ardoin, 1971) (Synonym: Anemia humeralis Ardoin, 1971)
  - C. opacula (Fairmaire, 1882)
  - C. punctata (Ardoin, 1971) (Synonym: Anemia punctata Ardoin, 1971)
  - C. sardous Géné, 1839 (Synonym: Anemia sardoa (Géné, 1839))
    - C. sardoa denticulata (Wollaston, 1867) (Synonym: Anemia sardoa sudanica Gridelli, 1950)
  - C. villiersi (Ardoin, 1971) (Synonym: Anemia villiersi Ardoin, 1971)
- Subgenus Spinanemia Ardoin, 1971
  - C. allardi (Ardoin, 1971) (Synonym: Anemia allardi Ardoin, 1971)
  - C. amieti (Ardoin, 1971) (Synonym: Anemia amieti Ardoin, 1971)
  - C. capensis (Ardoin, 1971) (Synonym: Anemia capensis Ardoin, 1971)
  - C. cornutus (Pic, 1898) (Synonym: Anemia cornuta Pic, 1898)
    - C. cornutus panelii (Ardoin, 1971) (Synonym: Anemia cornutus panelii Ardoin, 1971)
  - C. crispa (Quedenfeldt, 1885) (Synonym: Anemia crispa Quedenfeldt, 1885)
  - C. curta (Ardoin, 1971) (Synonym: Anemia curta Ardoin, 1971)
  - C. hottentota (Ardoin, 1971) (Synonym: Anemia hottentota Ardoin, 1971)
  - C. kaszabi (Ardoin, 1971) (Synonym: Anemia kaszabi Ardoin, 1971)
  - C. mystacina (Ardoin, 1971) (Synonym: Anemia mystacina Ardoin, 1971)
  - C. ovatula (Fairmaire, 1891)
  - C. pilosus (Tournier, 1868) (Synonyms: Anemia pilosa Tournier, 1868, Anemia fenyesi Reitter, 1897, Cheirodes fissidens Reitter, 1898)
  - C. poteli Lillig & Ferrer, 2001
  - C. roeri (Ardoin, 1976)
  - C. royi (Ardoin, 1971) (Synonym: Anemia royi Ardoin, 1971)
    - C. royi tchadensis (Ardoin, 1971) (Synonym: Anemia royi tchadensis Ardoin, 1971)
  - C. seriattipennis (Ardoin, 1971) (Synonym: Anemia seriattipennis Ardoin, 1971)
  - C. thoracicus (Fairmaire, 1891) (Synonym: Anemia thoracicus Fairmaire, 1891)
  - C. uhligi Ferrer, 2004
- Subgenus Anemiadena Ardoin, 1971
  - C. convexa (Gestro, 1881)
  - C. giraudini (Ardoin, 1971) (Synonym: Anemia giraudini Ardoin, 1971)
- Subgenus Trichanemia Ardoin, 1971
  - C. schmitzi (Ardoin, 1971) (Synonym: Anemia schmitzi Ardoin, 1971)
- Subgenus Histiaea Fairmaire, 1892
  - C. angolensis (Ardoin, 1971) (Synonym: Anemia angolensis Ardoin, 1971)
  - C. asperulus (Reitter, 1884) (Synonyms: Anemia denticulata Pic, 1923, Anemia aegyptiaca Pic, 1936, Anemia asperula Reitter, 1884, Anemia asperula var. seriesetosa Baudi, 1884)
  - C. bidentulus (Fairmaire, 1892) (Synonym: Histiaea bidentula Ardoin, 1971)
  - C. jaegeri Bremer, 2001
  - C. kochii (Ardoin, 1976)
  - C. sakalava (Alluaud, 1900)
  - C. schultzei (Geibien, 1910) (Synonym: A. submetallica Peringuey, 1908)
- Subgenus Pseudanemia Wollaston, 1864
  - C. abyssinica (Ardoin, 1971) (Synonym: Anemia abyssinica Ardoin, 1971)
  - C. brevicollis (Wollaston, 1864) (Synonyms: Anemia aphodioides Walker, 1871, Anemia rotundicollis Desbrochers, 1881, Anemia fausti Solsky, 1881, Anemia hauseri Reitter, 1894, Anemia striolata Fairmaire, 1894, Anemia pharao Reitter, 1897, Anemia curticollis Pic, 1923, Pseudanemia brevicollis Wollaston, 1864)
  - C. drurei (Pic, 1923) (Synonym: Anemia drurei Pic, 1923)
  - C. submetallicus (Raffray, 1873) (Synonyms: Anemia palaestina Pic, 1899, Anemia submetallica (Raffray, 1873), Anoemia submetallica Raffray, 1873)
- C. africanus Ferrer, 2016
- C. ahomanae Ferrer, 2016
- C. anatolicus Ferrer, 2016
- C. arabicus Ferrer, 2016
- C. californicus (Horn, 1870) (Synonym: Anaemia californica Horn, 1870)
- C. dentipes (Ballion, 1878) (Synonym: Microzoum dentipes Ballion, 1878)
- C. guanchorum Ferrer, 2016
- C. linnmani Ferrer, 2016
- C. massauensis Ferrer, 2016
- C. occulata (Wollaston, 1860)
- C. otomanus Ferrer, 2016
- C. ruthmuellerae Ferrer, 2016
- C. sculpturata (Ritsema, 1875)
