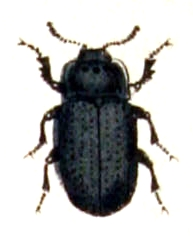
- An example of a melanimon: Melanimon Tibialis

Scientific classification
- Domain: Eukaryota
- Kingdom: Animalia
- Phylum: Arthropoda
- Class: Insecta
- Order: Coleoptera
- Suborder: Polyphaga
- Infraorder: Cucujiformia
- Family: Tenebrionidae
- Genus: Melanimon; Steven, 1829

= Melanimon =

Genus of beetles

Melanimon is a genus of beetles belonging to the family Tenebrionidae.

The species of this genus are found in Europe.

Species:

- Melanimon amalitae Ferrer & Castro Tovar, 2010
- Melanimon inermus Picka, 1983
