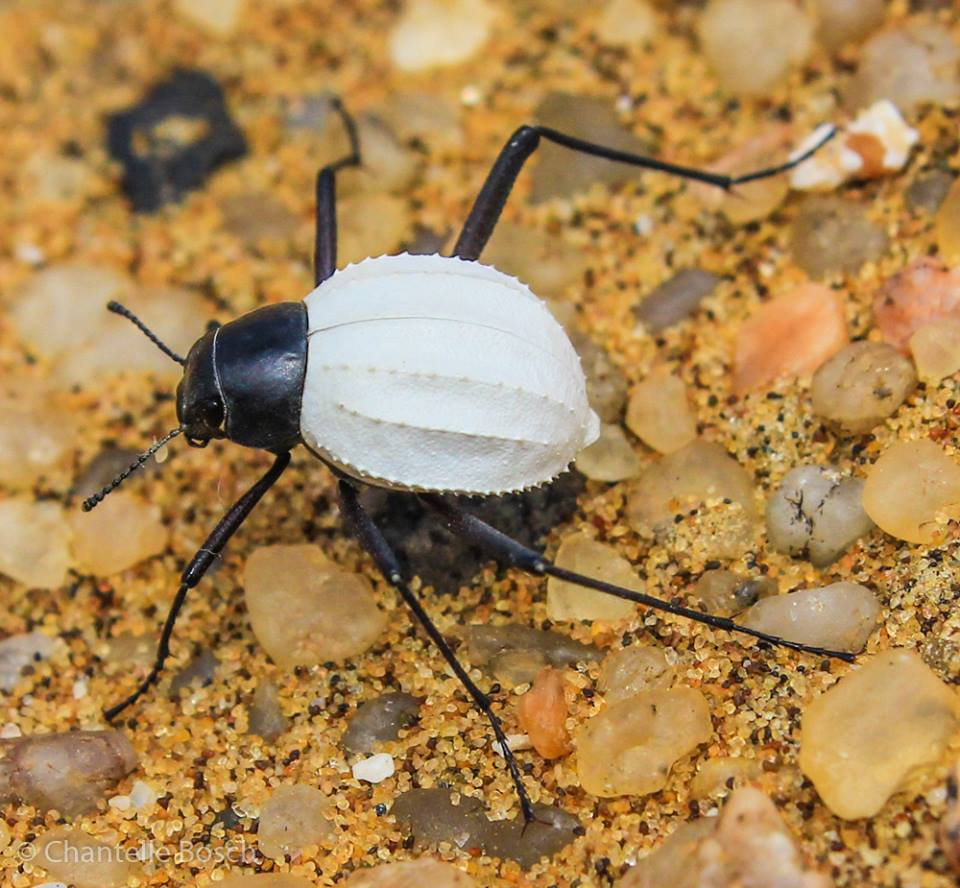
- C. eburnea

Scientific classification
- Kingdom: Animalia
- Phylum: Arthropoda
- Clade: Pancrustacea
- Class: Insecta
- Order: Coleoptera
- Suborder: Polyphaga
- Infraorder: Cucujiformia
- Family: Tenebrionidae
- Subfamily: Pimeliinae
- Tribe: Adesmiini
- Genus: Cauricara; Penrith, 1979

= Cauricara =

Genus of darkling beetles

Cauricara is a genus of darkling beetles that are native to Southern Africa. Many of these species are endemic to Namibia.

== Species ==
The species recognized in this genus are:

- Cauricara albomarginata Penrith, 1979
- Cauricara albovillosa (Péringuey, 1892)
- Cauricara desertica (Koch, 1952)
- Cauricara eburnea (Pascoe, 1866)
- Cauricara phalangium (Gebien, 1920)
- Cauricara velox (Péringuey, 1886)

Formerly in Stenocara:

- Stenocara eburnea - Cauricara eburnea
- Stenocara desertica - Cauricara desertica
