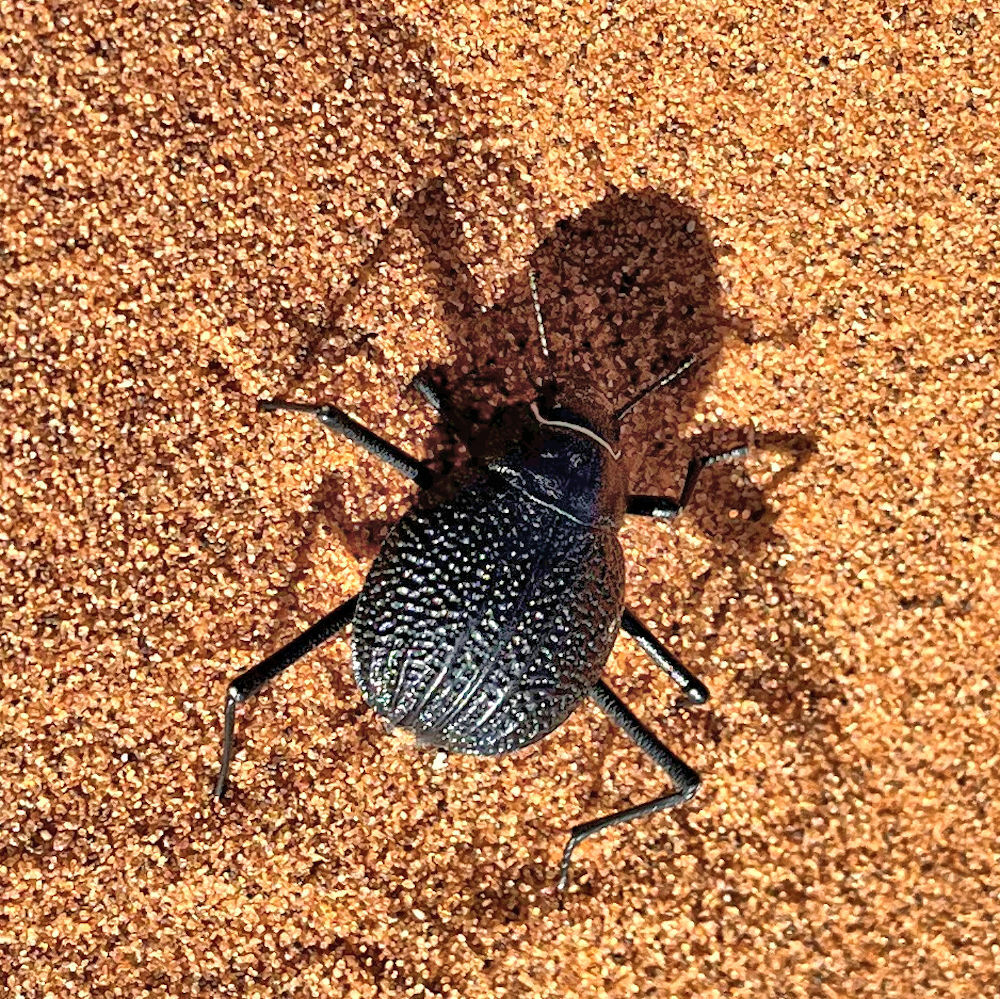
- Onymacris plana, Namibia

Scientific classification
- Kingdom: Animalia
- Phylum: Arthropoda
- Class: Insecta
- Order: Coleoptera
- Suborder: Polyphaga
- Infraorder: Cucujiformia
- Family: Tenebrionidae
- Subfamily: Pimeliinae
- Tribe: Adesmiini
- Genus: Onymacris
- Species: O. plana

Binomial name
- Onymacris plana (Péringuey, 1888)

Synonyms
- Adesmia plana Péringuey, 1888

= Onymacris plana =

Species of beetles

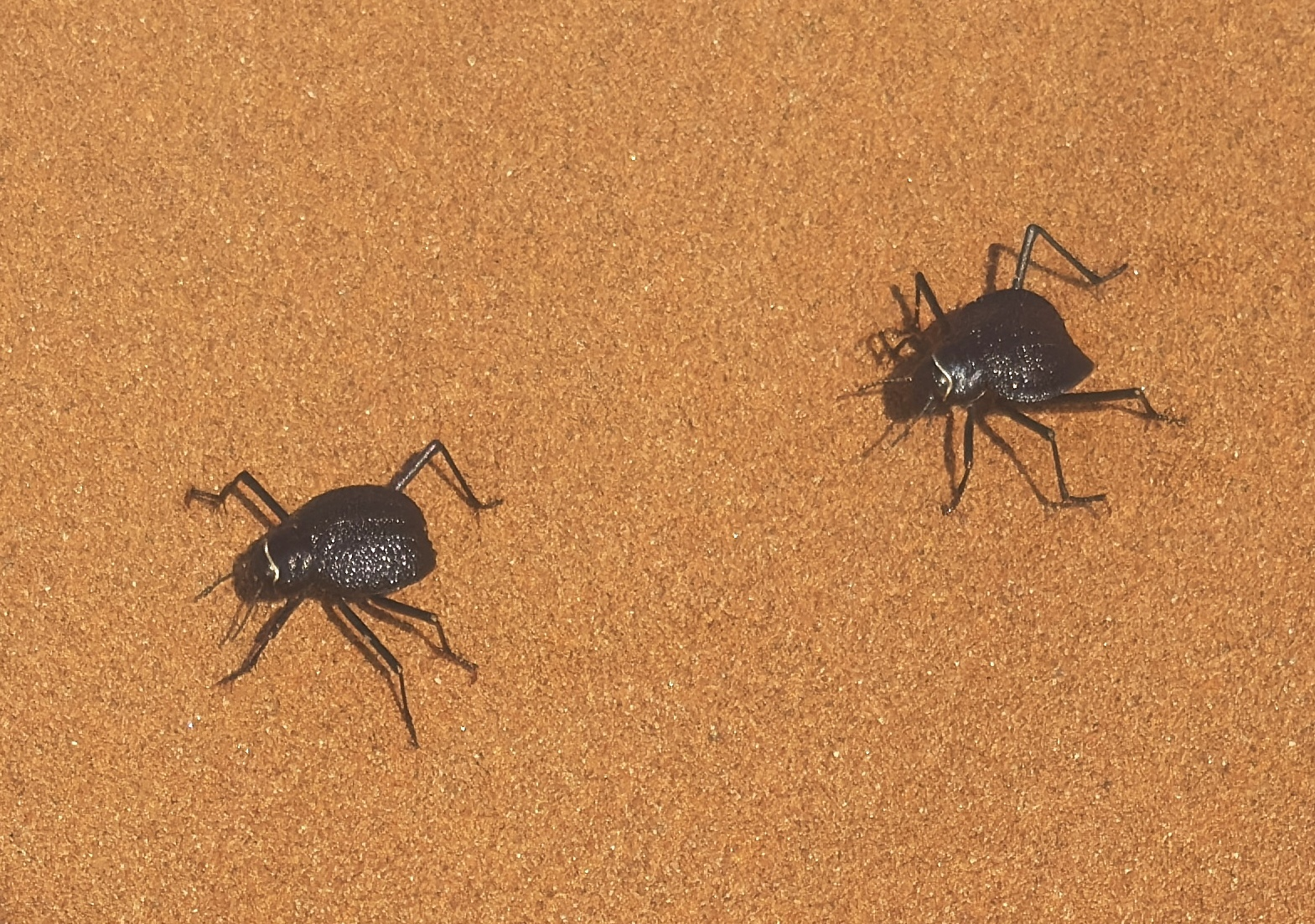
Onymacris plana, Namibia. A male follows a female running on the Namib Desert dunes.

Onymacris plana is a species of darkling beetle in the family Tenebrionidae, endemic to the Namib Dune Sea in southwestern Namibia.

The small beetles (10-15 mm in diameter) live on sparsely vegetated sand dunes, feeding on wind-blown detritus. The beetles are diurnal, typically feeding during the day when nocturnal predators are not active.

While they are flightless, the beetles are known for running at high speed for their small size (around 2.5 mph or 1.2 m/s). Males sometimes follow females as they run across the dunes. It has been determined that the fast running reduces their body temperature. This is beneficial because the solar radiation generates a surface temperature on the dunes of 50°C (122°F) or more during 8 months of the year. Body cooling is aided by their relatively long legs, which lift the body above the surface, and their flat body shape, which exposes more of the body's surface area to the air.
