= Nilio suturalis =

Scientific classification
- Kingdom: Animalia
- Phylum: Arthropoda
- Clade: Pancrustacea
- Class: Insecta
- Order: Coleoptera
- Suborder: Polyphaga
- Infraorder: Cucujiformia
- Family: Tenebrionidae
- Genus: Nilio
- Species: N. suturalis

Binomial name
- Nilio suturalis Thomson, 1860

Species of beetle

Nilio suturalis is a species of beetle of the family Tenebrionidae. It is found in Bolivia.
