= Nilio panicaseus =

Scientific classification
- Kingdom: Animalia
- Phylum: Arthropoda
- Clade: Pancrustacea
- Class: Insecta
- Order: Coleoptera
- Suborder: Polyphaga
- Infraorder: Cucujiformia
- Family: Tenebrionidae
- Genus: Nilio
- Species: N. panicaseus

Binomial name
- Nilio panicaseus Macari & Almeida, 2026

Species of beetle

Nilio panicaseus is a species of beetle of the family Tenebrionidae. It is found in Brazil (Minas Gerais).

== Description ==
Adults reach a length of about 7.3 mm (0.29 in). They have a rounded, dorsally convex body. The integument is punctate with dense gold pubescence. The colour is yellowish-brown.

== Etymology ==
The species name is derived from Latin panicaseus (meaning bread and cheese) and alludes to the body shape of the species, which resembles the Brazilian snack Pão de queijo, typical of the region where the type specimen was collected.
