= Nilio rubrocastaneus =

Scientific classification
- Kingdom: Animalia
- Phylum: Arthropoda
- Clade: Pancrustacea
- Class: Insecta
- Order: Coleoptera
- Suborder: Polyphaga
- Infraorder: Cucujiformia
- Family: Tenebrionidae
- Genus: Nilio
- Species: N. rubrocastaneus

Binomial name
- Nilio rubrocastaneus Thomson, 1860

Synonyms
- Nilio rubrocastaneum

Species of beetle

Nilio rubrocastaneus is a species of beetle of the family Tenebrionidae. It is found in French Guiana and Brazil (Pará).
