= Nilio domingosi =

Scientific classification
- Kingdom: Animalia
- Phylum: Arthropoda
- Clade: Pancrustacea
- Class: Insecta
- Order: Coleoptera
- Suborder: Polyphaga
- Infraorder: Cucujiformia
- Family: Tenebrionidae
- Genus: Nilio
- Species: N. domingosi

Binomial name
- Nilio domingosi Macari & Almeida, 2026

Species of beetle

Nilio domingosi is a species of beetle of the family Tenebrionidae. It is found in Brazil (Amazonas).

== Description ==
Adults reach a length of about 5.7 mm (0.22 in). They have a rounded, dorsally convex body. The integument is punctate with dense gold pubescence. The colour is yellowish to reddish-brown with the ventral surface reddish-brown.

== Etymology ==
The species is named in honour of Domingos Antonio Macari, the late father of the first author.
