= Nilio testaceus =

Scientific classification
- Kingdom: Animalia
- Phylum: Arthropoda
- Clade: Pancrustacea
- Class: Insecta
- Order: Coleoptera
- Suborder: Polyphaga
- Infraorder: Cucujiformia
- Family: Tenebrionidae
- Genus: Nilio
- Species: N. testaceus

Binomial name
- Nilio testaceus Thomson, 1860

Synonyms
- Nilio testaceum

Species of beetle

Nilio testaceus is a species of beetle of the family Tenebrionidae. It is found in French Guiana and Brazil (Acre, Amazonas, Pará, Rondônia, Maranhão, Mato Grosso).
