= Nilio vulpinus =

Scientific classification
- Kingdom: Animalia
- Phylum: Arthropoda
- Clade: Pancrustacea
- Class: Insecta
- Order: Coleoptera
- Suborder: Polyphaga
- Infraorder: Cucujiformia
- Family: Tenebrionidae
- Genus: Nilio
- Species: N. vulpinus

Binomial name
- Nilio vulpinus Mader, 1936

Species of beetle

Nilio vulpinus is a species of beetle of the family Tenebrionidae. It is found in Peru.
