= Nilio mukambu =

Scientific classification
- Kingdom: Animalia
- Phylum: Arthropoda
- Clade: Pancrustacea
- Class: Insecta
- Order: Coleoptera
- Suborder: Polyphaga
- Infraorder: Cucujiformia
- Family: Tenebrionidae
- Genus: Nilio
- Species: N. mukambu

Binomial name
- Nilio mukambu Macari & Almeida, 2026

Species of beetle

Nilio mukambu is a species of beetle of the family Tenebrionidae. It is found in Brazil (Ceará).

== Description ==
Adults reach a length of about 10.4 mm (0.41 in). They have a rounded, dorsally convex body. The integument is punctate with dense gold pubescence. The colour is brown with the ventral surface reddish-brown to black.

== Etymology ==
The name mukambu alludes to the type locality, the municipality of Mucambo, where the Carqueijo community is located. The term mucambo is derived from mukambu which means hideout or shelter in Angolan Kimbundu language.
