= Nilio lafertei =

Scientific classification
- Kingdom: Animalia
- Phylum: Arthropoda
- Clade: Pancrustacea
- Class: Insecta
- Order: Coleoptera
- Suborder: Polyphaga
- Infraorder: Cucujiformia
- Family: Tenebrionidae
- Genus: Nilio
- Species: N. lafertei

Binomial name
- Nilio lafertei Thomson, 1860

Species of beetle

Nilio lafertei is a species of beetle of the family Tenebrionidae. It is found in Colombia and Brazil (Amazonas, Pará).
