= Nilio pachamama =

Scientific classification
- Kingdom: Animalia
- Phylum: Arthropoda
- Clade: Pancrustacea
- Class: Insecta
- Order: Coleoptera
- Suborder: Polyphaga
- Infraorder: Cucujiformia
- Family: Tenebrionidae
- Genus: Nilio
- Species: N. pachamama

Binomial name
- Nilio pachamama Macari & Almeida, 2026

Species of beetle

Nilio pachamama is a species of beetle of the family Tenebrionidae. It is found in Peru.

== Description ==
Adults reach a length of about 7.7 mm (0.30 in). They have a rounded, dorsally convex body. The integument is punctate with dense gold pubescence. The colour is yellowish to dark brown.

== Etymology ==
The name pachamama alludes to the Inca goddess of nature and fertility. In the Aymara and Quechua languages, Pachamama means Mother Earth, and it was chosen in reference to the holotype female carrying eggs and the species’ place of occurrence.
