= Nilio collaris =

Scientific classification
- Kingdom: Animalia
- Phylum: Arthropoda
- Clade: Pancrustacea
- Class: Insecta
- Order: Coleoptera
- Suborder: Polyphaga
- Infraorder: Cucujiformia
- Family: Tenebrionidae
- Genus: Nilio
- Species: N. collaris

Binomial name
- Nilio collaris Thomson, 1860

Species of beetle

Nilio collaris is a species of beetle of the family Tenebrionidae. It is found in Colombia and Brazil (Amazonas).
