= Kuhitangiinae =

Scientific classification
- Domain: Eukaryota
- Kingdom: Animalia
- Phylum: Arthropoda
- Class: Insecta
- Order: Coleoptera
- Suborder: Polyphaga
- Infraorder: Cucujiformia
- Family: Tenebrionidae
- Subfamily: Kuhitangiinae; G.S. Medvedev, 1962

Tribes
- Foranotini Nabozhenko & Sadeghi, 2017; Kuhitangiini G.S. Medvedev, 1962

Subfamily of beetles

Kuhitangiinae is a subfamily of darkling beetles in the family Tenebrionidae found in the Palearctic. There are two genera in Kuhitangiinae, each in its own tribe.

== Genera ==
These tribes and genera belong to the subfamily Kuhitangiinae:

- Tribe Foranotini Nabozhenko & Sadeghi, 2017
  - Genus Foranotum Nabozhenko & Sadeghi, 2017
- Tribe Kuhitangiini G.S. Medvedev, 1962
  - Genus Kuhitangia G.S. Medvedev, 1962
