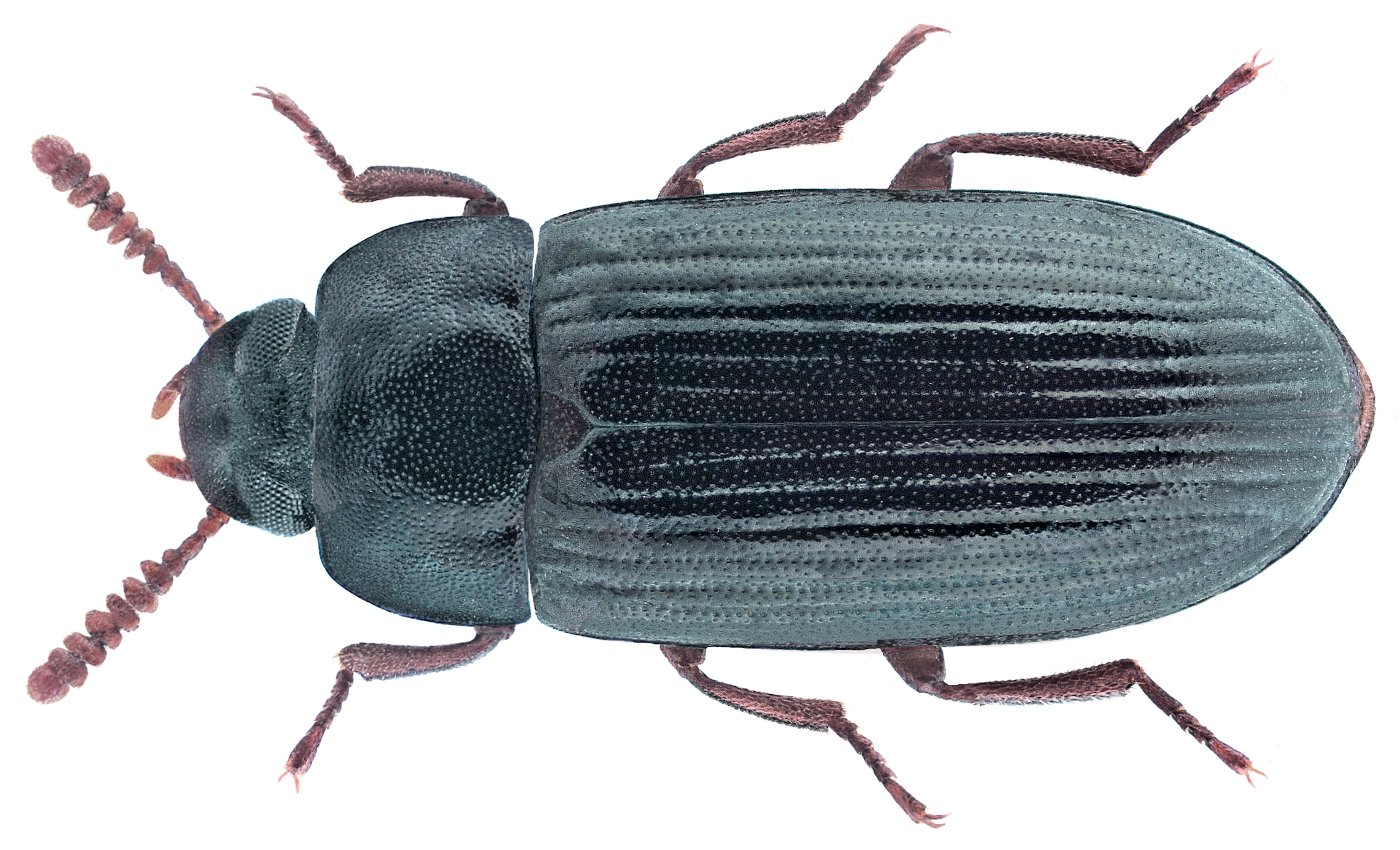

Scientific classification
- Kingdom: Animalia
- Phylum: Arthropoda
- Clade: Pancrustacea
- Class: Insecta
- Order: Coleoptera
- Suborder: Polyphaga
- Infraorder: Cucujiformia
- Family: Tenebrionidae
- Genus: Ulomoides
- Species: U. dermestoides

Binomial name
- Ulomoides dermestoides (Fairmaire, 1893)

Synonyms
- Martianus dermestoides; Palembus dermestoides

= Ulomoides dermestoides =

Species of beetle

Ulomoides dermestoides is a species of beetle in the family Tenebrionidae, known under a variety of common names, such as Chinese beetle, Chinese weevil, peanut beetle, cancer beetle, or asthma beetle. While native to Asia, it has been spread worldwide due to the belief that it has medicinal properties.

== History ==
Like other members of the genus Ulomoides, U. dermestoides is a pest of grain and grain products, and is easily reared on bread and similar foodstuffs. Ulomoides dermestoides was widely applied in Japanese and Chinese folk medicines in the treatment of low back pain, cough, and respiratory disorders such as asthma. The beetle primarily came to international attention around 2000, when news reports emerged that it was being imported and eaten in Argentina and Brazil; beetles were reared at home and distributed through a community network that promoted the consumption of live beetles, with the purpose of alleviating or curing "diseases such as asthma, Parkinson's, diabetes, arthritis, HIV and cancer." At that time, it was commonly called "the chinese weevil" (or "gorgojo chino"), although it is not related to true weevils.

== Medical studies ==
Given that thousands of people were consuming large numbers of these beetles (several thousand per person), the medical community responded with numerous studies, with a variety of results, though none confirming the claims of curative properties. The chemicals, primarily quinones, that the beetles produce as defensive compounds are capable of killing cells (significant cytotoxicity), affecting both healthy and cancerous tissues, and overconsumption of beetles can lead to serious health complications such as pneumonia, and thus contraindicated as a medical treatment. Diluted extract from these beetles has been found to have anti-inflammatory properties, but at higher doses the toxic effects predominate.
