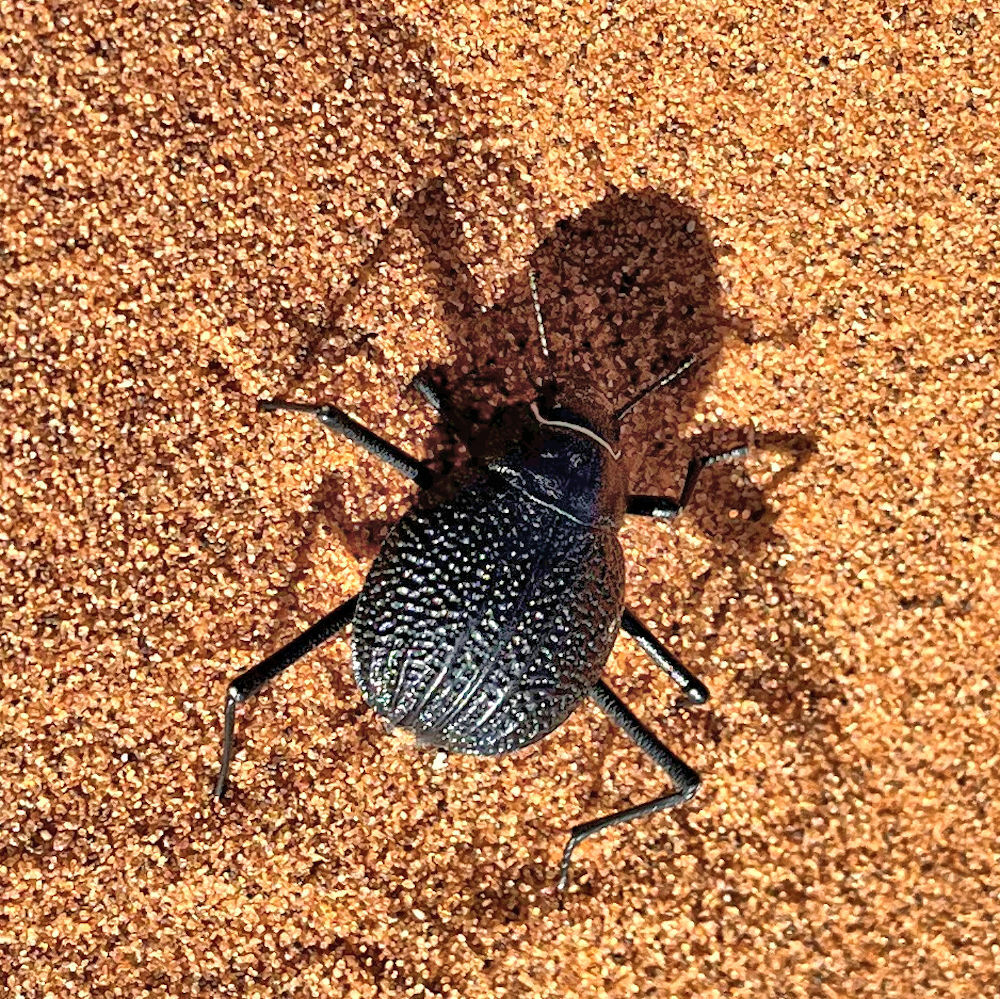
- Onymacris plana, Namibia

Scientific classification
- Kingdom: Animalia
- Phylum: Arthropoda
- Class: Insecta
- Order: Coleoptera
- Suborder: Polyphaga
- Infraorder: Cucujiformia
- Family: Tenebrionidae
- Subfamily: Pimeliinae
- Tribe: Adesmiini
- Genus: Onymacris; Allard, 1885

= Onymacris =

Genus of beetles

Onymacris is a genus of darkling beetles in the family Tenebrionidae. There are about 14 described species in Onymacris. They are found primarily along the southwestern coast of Africa, especially in the Namib Desert.

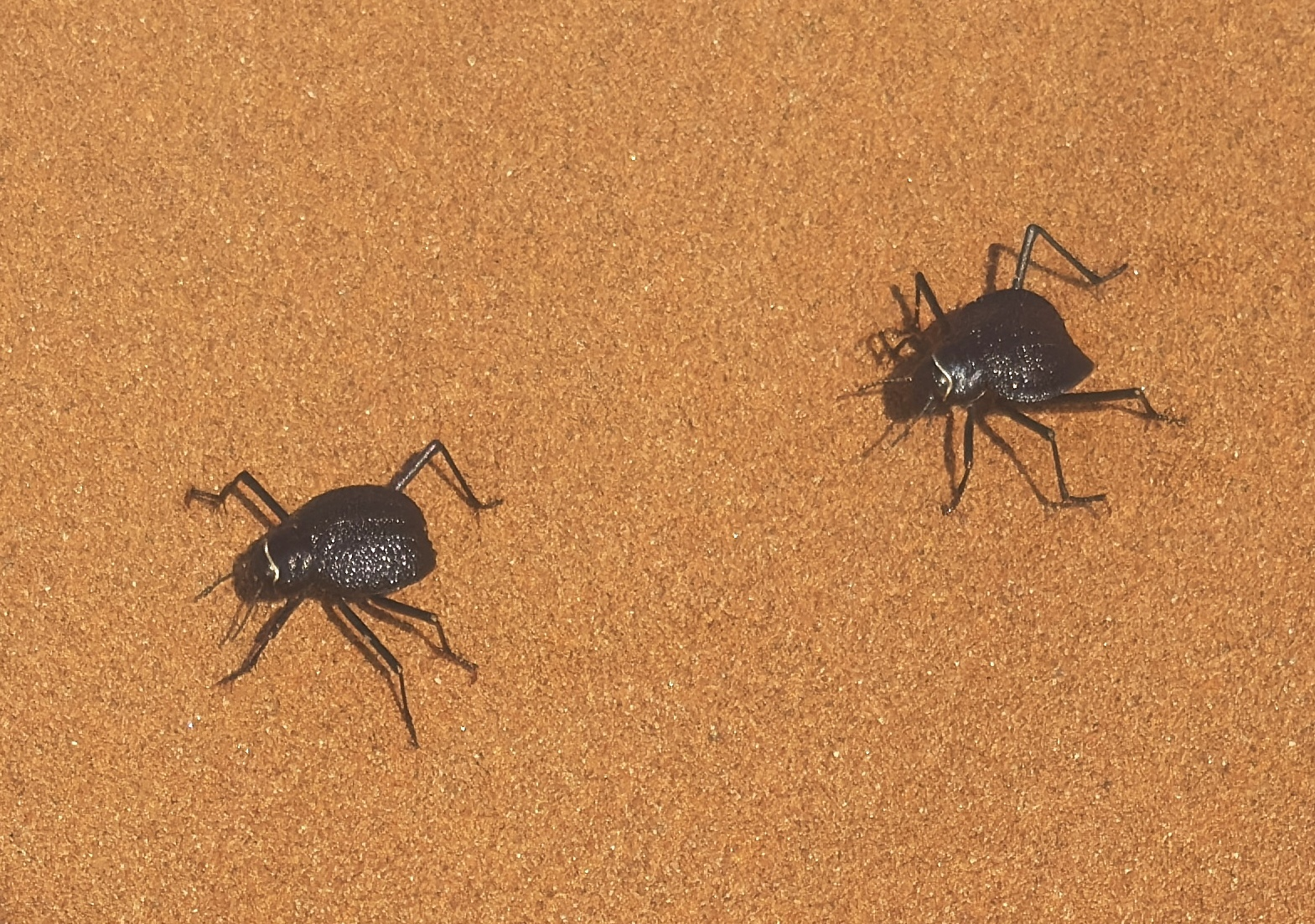
Onymacris plana, Namibia

== Species ==
These 14 species belong to the genus Onymacris:

- Onymacris bicolor (Haag-Rutenberg, 1875)
- Onymacris boschimana (Péringuey, 1888)
- Onymacris brainei Penrith, 1984
- Onymacris candidipennis (Bréme, 1840)
- Onymacris hottentota (Péringuey, 1888)
- Onymacris laeviceps Gebien, 1938
- Onymacris langi (Guérin-Méneville, 1843)
- Onymacris lobicollis (Fairmaire, 1888)
- Onymacris marginipennis (Breme, 1840)
- Onymacris multistriata (Haag-Rutenberg, 1875)
- Onymacris paiva (Haag-Rutenberg, 1875)
- Onymacris plana (Péringuey, 1888)
- Onymacris rugatipennis (Haag-Rutenberg, 1875)
- Onymacris unguicularis (Haag-Rutenberg, 1875)
