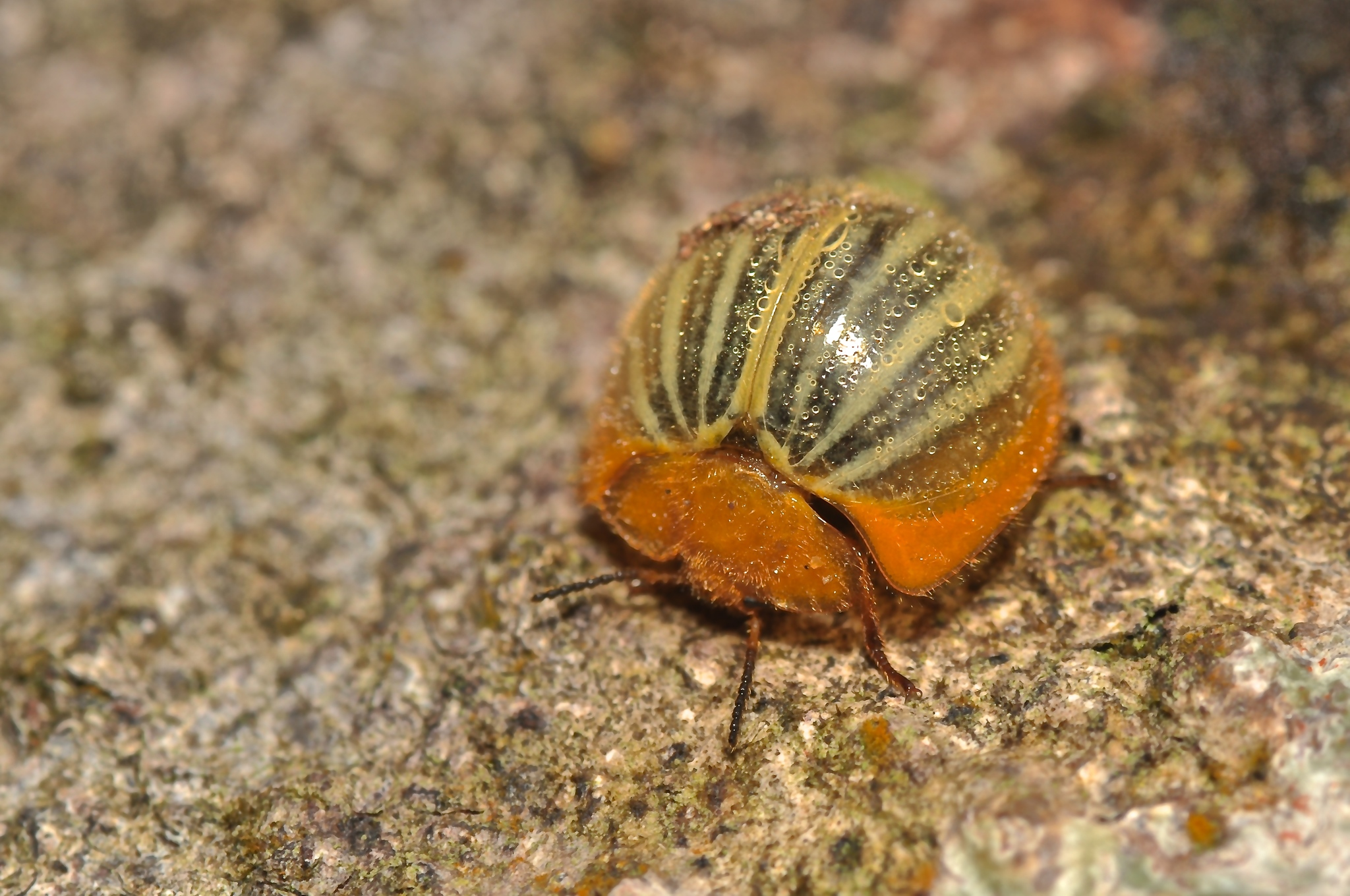
- In Ecuador

Scientific classification
- Kingdom: Animalia
- Phylum: Arthropoda
- Clade: Pancrustacea
- Class: Insecta
- Order: Coleoptera
- Suborder: Polyphaga
- Infraorder: Cucujiformia
- Family: Tenebrionidae
- Subfamily: Nilioninae; Oken, 1843
- Genus: Nilio; Latreille, 1802

Subgenera
- Linio Bouchard & Bousquet, 2021; Micronilio Pic, 1936; Nilio Latreille, 1802

= Nilio =

Genus of insects

Nilio is a genus of false lady beetles found in the Neotropics. It is the only genus in the darkling beetle subfamily Nilioninae.

== Selected species ==
- subgenus Linio Mader, 1936 (4 species)
  - Nilio maculatus Germar, 1824
  - Nilio varius Ihering, 1914
- subgenus Micronilio Pic, 1936 (4 species)
  - Nilio barthi Costa Lima & Seabra, 1954
  - Nilio gounellei Ihering, 1914 (= Nilio punctatus Pic, 1918)
  - Nilio lenkoi Reichardt, 1965
  - Nilio pusillus Ihering, 1914
- subgenus Nilio (39 species)
  - Nilio aenus Thomson, 1860
  - Nilio amazonicum Thomson, 1860
  - Nilio brunneus Thomson, 1860
  - Nilio chiriquensis Champion, 1888
  - Nilio coccinelloides Laporte de Castelnau, 1840
  - Nilio coffeatus Ihering, 1914
  - Nilio collaris Thomson, 1860
  - Nilio domingosi Macari & Almeida, 2026
  - Nilio fulvopilosus Champion, 1888
  - Nilio insuturale Pic, 1918
  - Nilio krumpschimdi Mader, 1936
  - Nilio lafertei Thomson, 1860
  - Nilio lanatus Germar, 1824
  - Nilio lebasi J. Thomson, 1860
  - Nilio lutzi Ihering, 1914
  - Nilio marginellus Erichson, 1847
  - Nilio monnei Macari & Almeida, 2026
  - Nilio mukambu Macari & Almeida, 2026
  - Nilio pachamama Macari & Almeida, 2026
  - Nilio panicaseus Macari & Almeida, 2026
  - Nilio peruvianus Thomson, 1860
  - Nilio pilosum Laporte de Castelnau, 1840
  - Nilio rubrocastaneum Thomson, 1860
  - Nilio ruficeps Pic, 1918
  - Nilio sallei J. Thomson, 1860
  - Nilio suturalis Thomson, 1860
  - Nilio testaceum Thomson, 1860
  - Nilio thomsoni Champion, 1888
  - Nilio tomentosus Dejean, 1837
  - Nilio villosus (Fabricius, 1787)
  - Nilio vulpinus Mader, 1936
  - †Nilio dominicana Poinar & Brown, 2011
