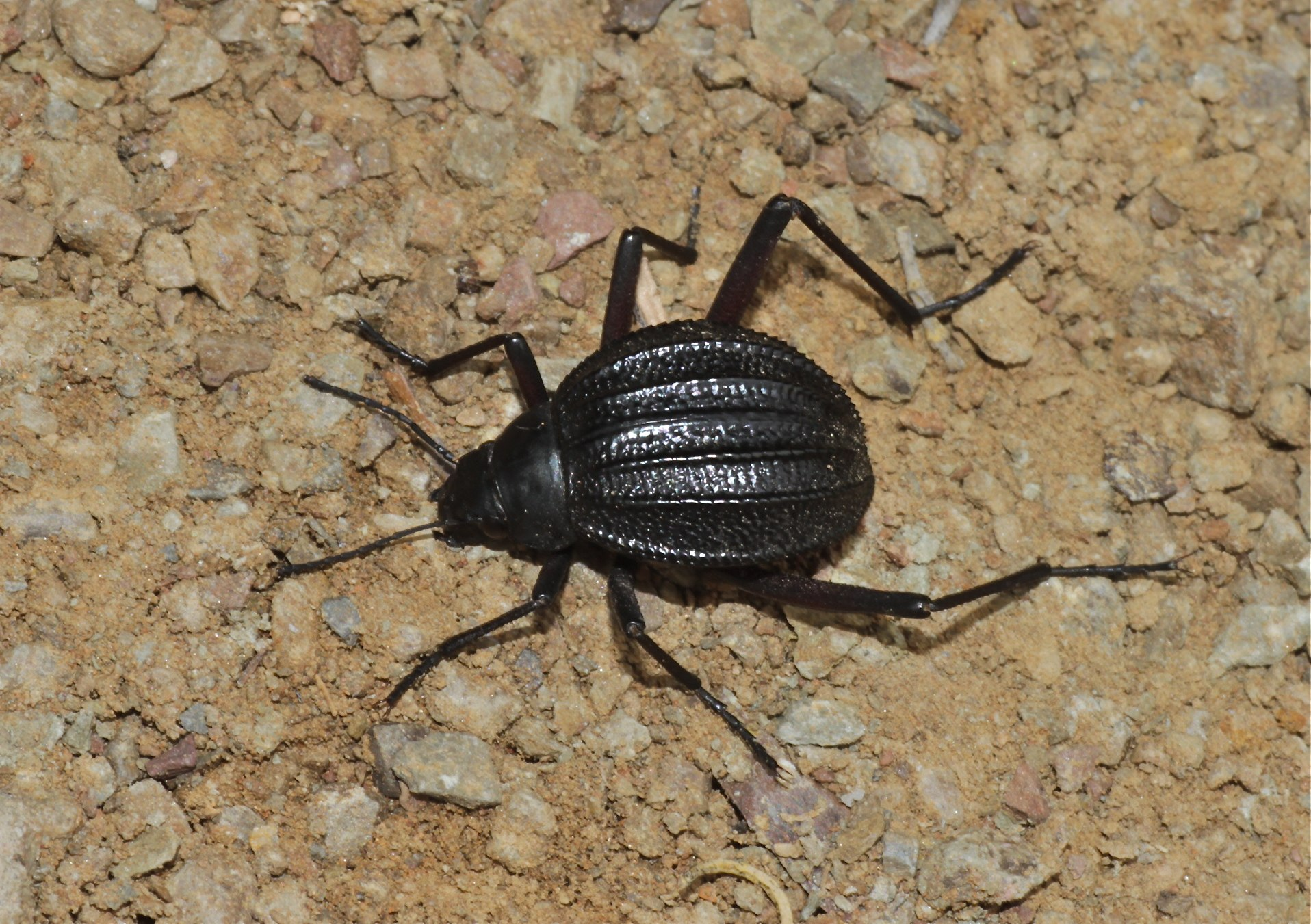
- Stenocara sp. in Sam Knott N. R., Eastern Cape, South Africa

Scientific classification
- Kingdom: Animalia
- Phylum: Arthropoda
- Clade: Pancrustacea
- Class: Insecta
- Order: Coleoptera
- Suborder: Polyphaga
- Infraorder: Cucujiformia
- Family: Tenebrionidae
- Subfamily: Pimeliinae
- Tribe: Adesmiini
- Genus: Stenocara; Solier, 1835

Synonyms
- Arenacara Penrith, 1979; Stenochara Hope, 1841

= Stenocara =

Genus of beetles

Stenocara is a genus of darkling beetles which is native to southern Africa. Several species are endemic to Namibia.

== Species ==
Species include:

- Stenocara aenescens Haag-Rutenberg, 1875
- Stenocara batesi
  - Stenocara batesi machadoi
- Stenocara brevicollis Haag-Rutenberg
  - Stenocara brevicollis bethanica
- Stenocara brunnipes
- Stenocara dentata Koch
  - Stenocara dentata rotundata
- Stenocara dilaticornis Koch
- Stenocara fitzsimonsi Koch
- Stenocara gracilipes
- Stenocara inaffectata Gebien
- Stenocara kalaharica Koch
- Stenocara longipes
- Stenocara magnophthalma Koch
- Stenocara namaqua
- Stenocara namaquensis Gebien
- Stenocara pisceflumine Penrith
- Stenocara quadrimaculata Koch
- Stenocara tenuicornis Penrith

Formerly in this genus:

- Stenocara eburnea is now Cauricara eburnea
- Stenocara desertica is now Cauricara desertica

== Gallery ==
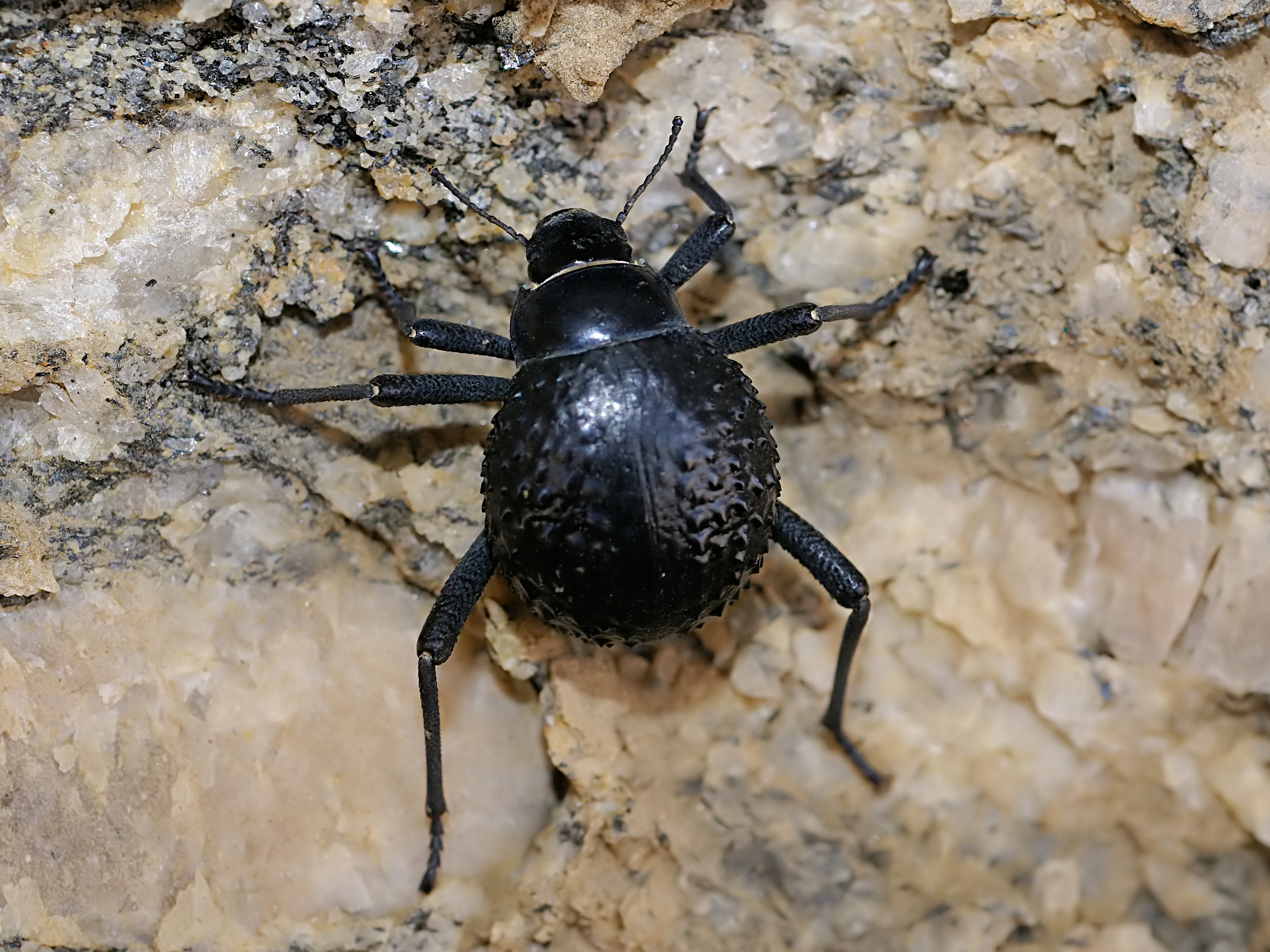
Long-legged darkling beetle, S. dentata, in Namibia

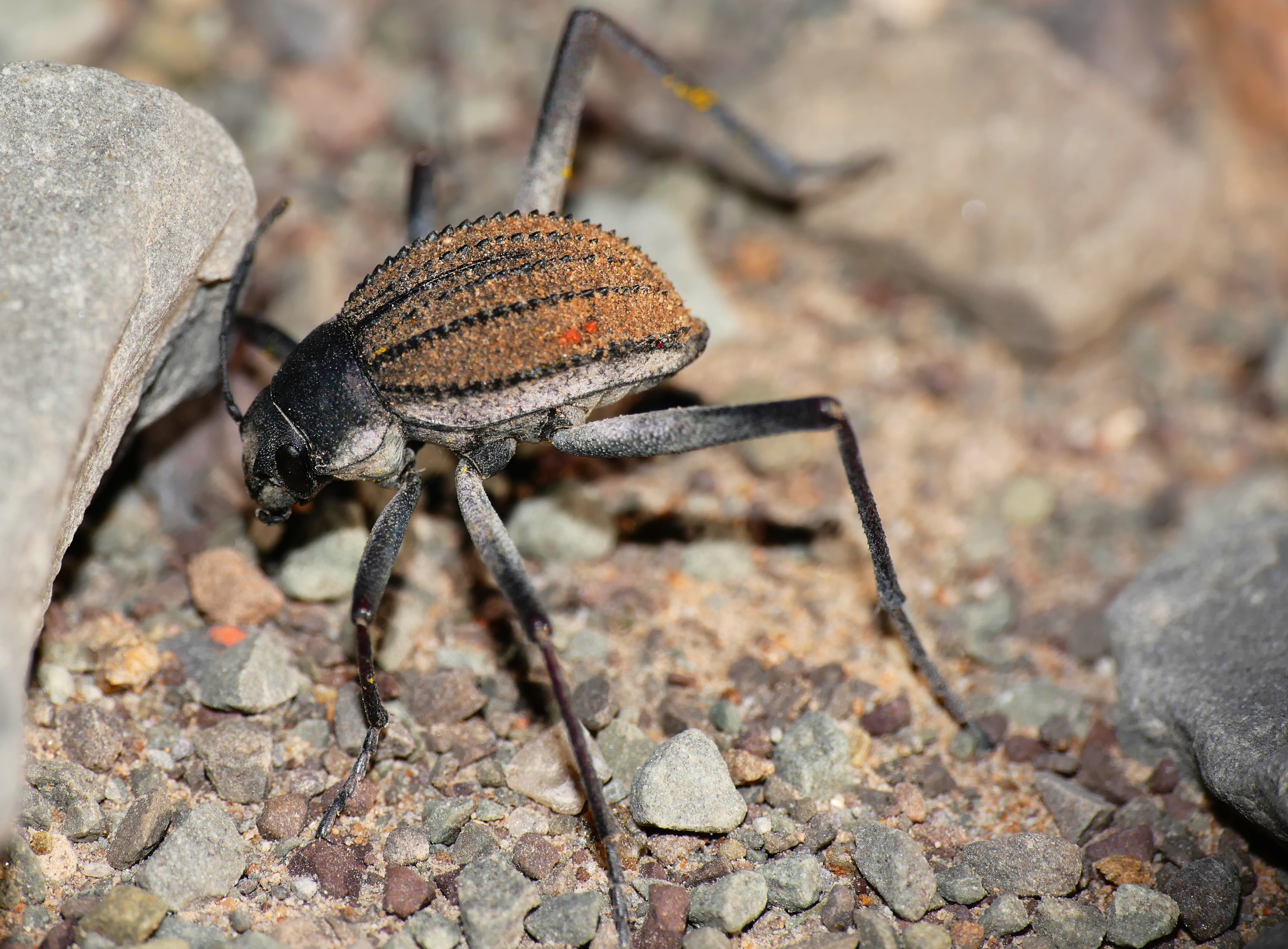
The fogstand beetle, S. gracilipes, in Namibia
