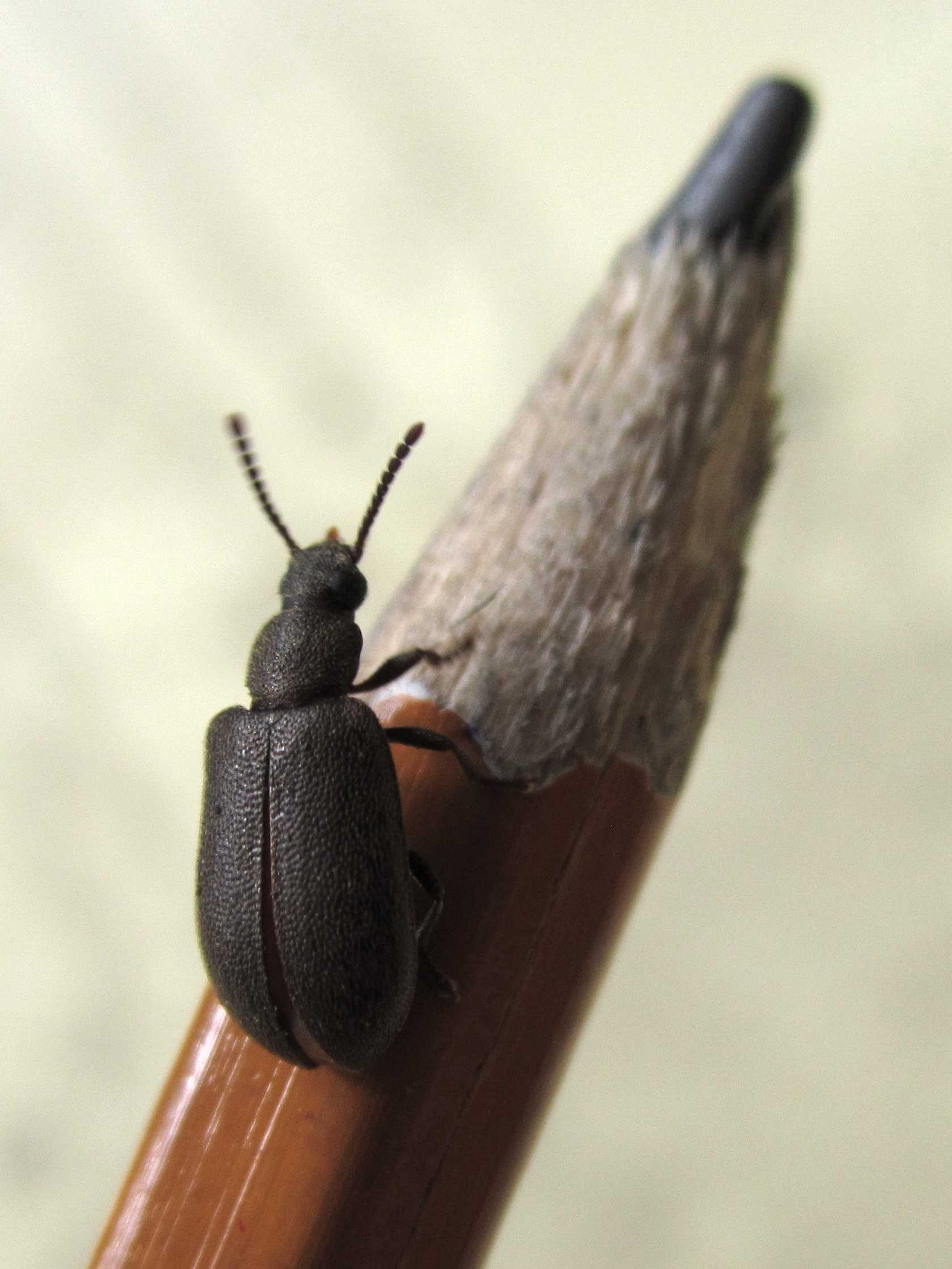
- A Mupli beetle resting on a pencil

Scientific classification
- Kingdom: Animalia
- Phylum: Arthropoda
- Class: Insecta
- Order: Coleoptera
- Suborder: Polyphaga
- Infraorder: Cucujiformia
- Family: Tenebrionidae
- Genus: Luprops
- Species: L. tristis

Binomial name
- Luprops tristis Fabricius, 1801

= Luprops tristis =

Species of beetle

Luprops tristis, the Mupli beetle, is a plant detritus eating darkling beetle found in parts of India. The adult beetle is black and around 8 millimetres (0.31 in) long. While they are usually harmless to humans, when squeezed or picked up, they produce a defensive phenolic secretion that causes skin burns. Luprops beetles have a notorious reputation since large populations invade farm houses, as reported in some parts of southern India, especially the state of Kerala.

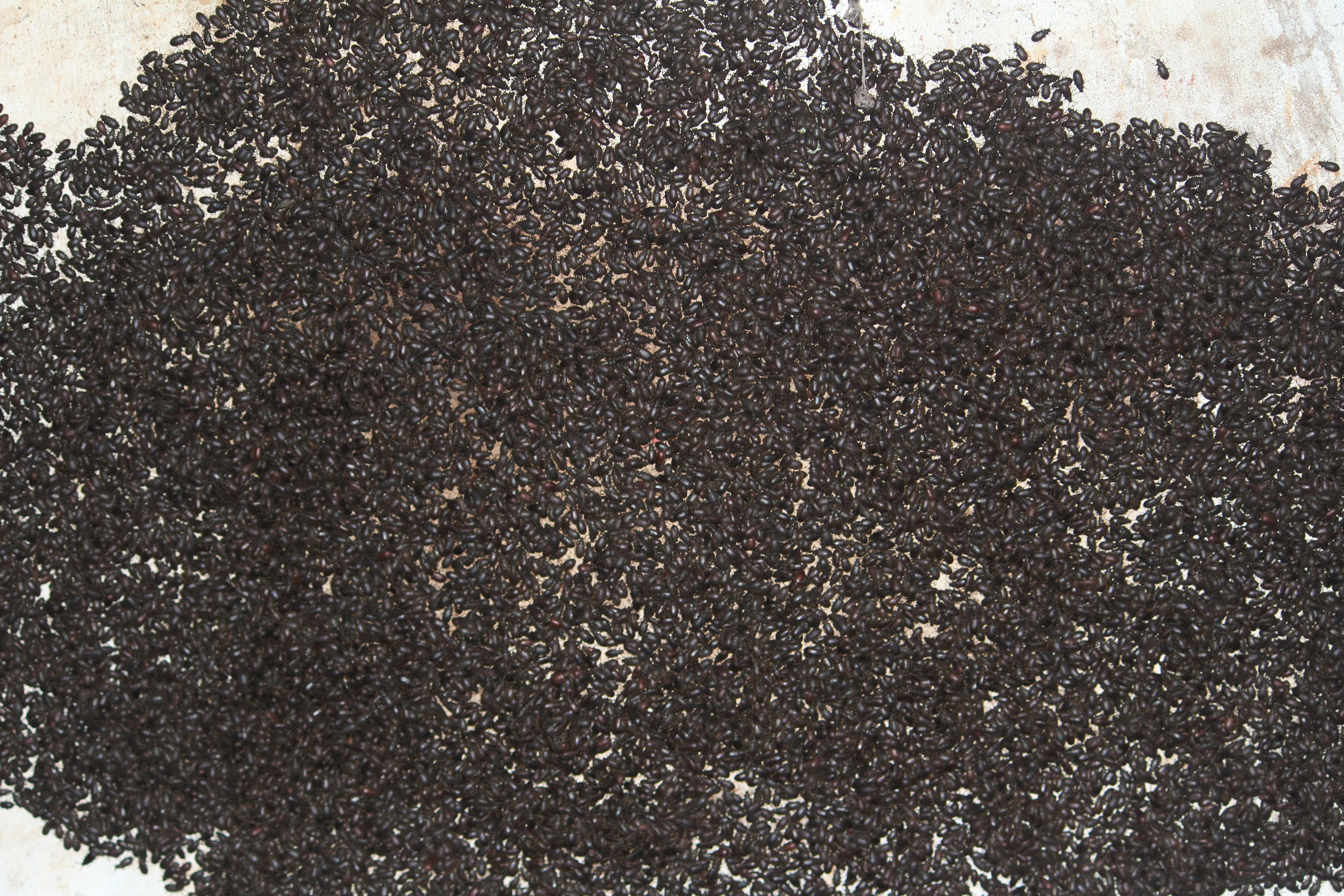
A large group of Mupli beetles from Kalliad, Kannur, Kerala

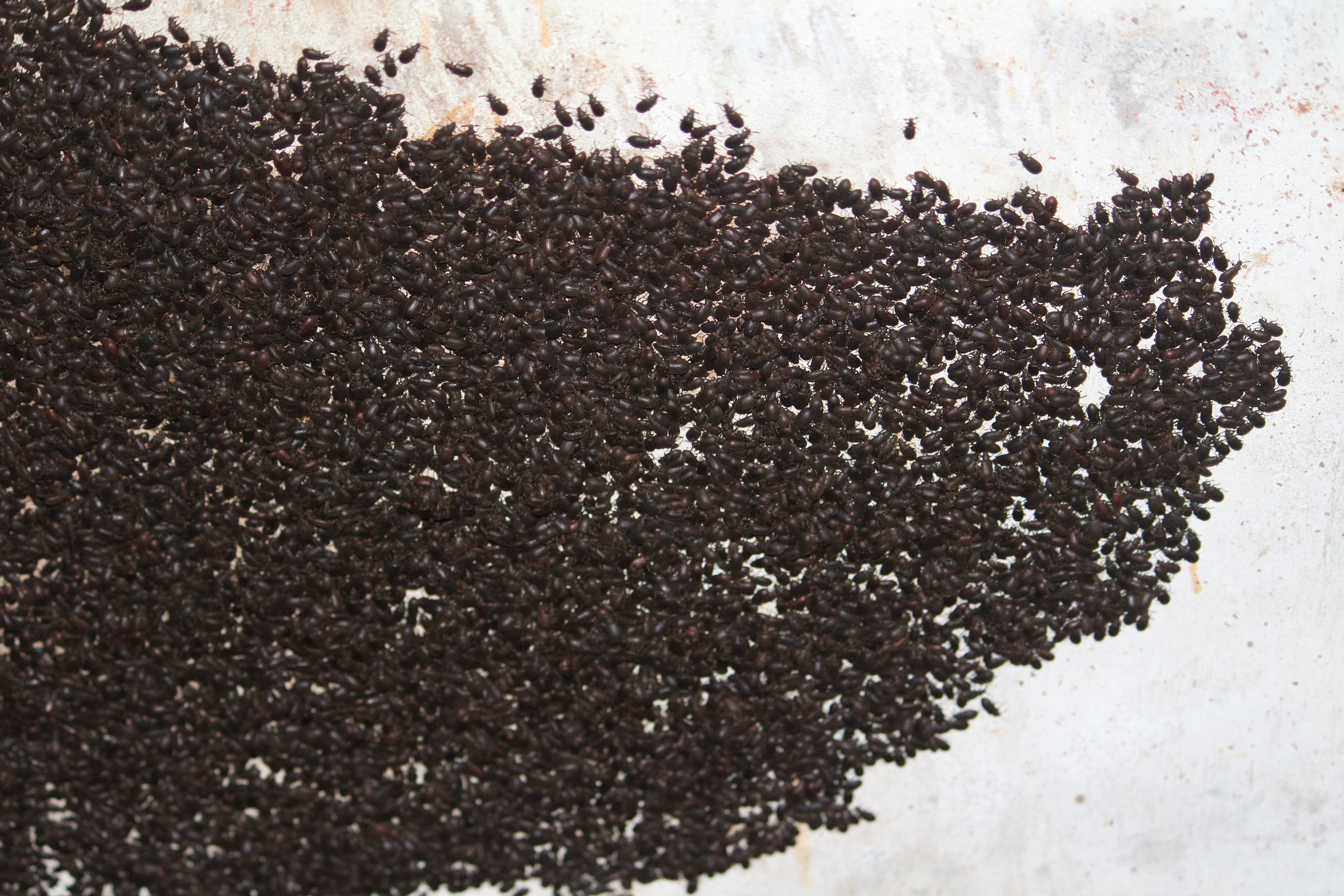
Another large group of Mupli beetles from Kalliad, Kannur, Kerala

== Description ==
Luprops tristis goes through five larval instar stages and a pupal stage before the adult stage. The adult beetle is colored black. There is very little sexual dimorphism, and males and females overlap in size. After a month of active feeding in the adult form, they go into a lengthy dormant period in a suitable undisturbed dark location in response to the first summer rains before emerging again to feed and reproduce.

== Relationship to people ==
In the rubber plantations of tropical southern India in Kerala, Mupli beetles are considered a major nuisance, to the point of infestations rendering some buildings uninhabitable. While these beetles do not deliberately attack people, they produce a defensive odoriferous phenolic secretion when provoked that causes skin blisters. This is most commonly triggered by accidentally squeezing a beetle. They invade homes and other buildings in very large numbers, estimates ranging up to 4.5 million individuals in a single building. They will then enter the dormant stage in masses, creating beehive-like masses under the roof. Like many other insects they are attracted to light, and can be more of a nuisance at night. One effective and harmless way to kill these beetles is to spray kerosene in the infected areas. It will kill them instantly as long as the kerosene is physically present. However, once vaporized, it becomes ineffective. Nevertheless, spraying petrol is one of the most cost-effective ways for the instantaneous termination of beetles although one must take care to preempt the possibility for fire.

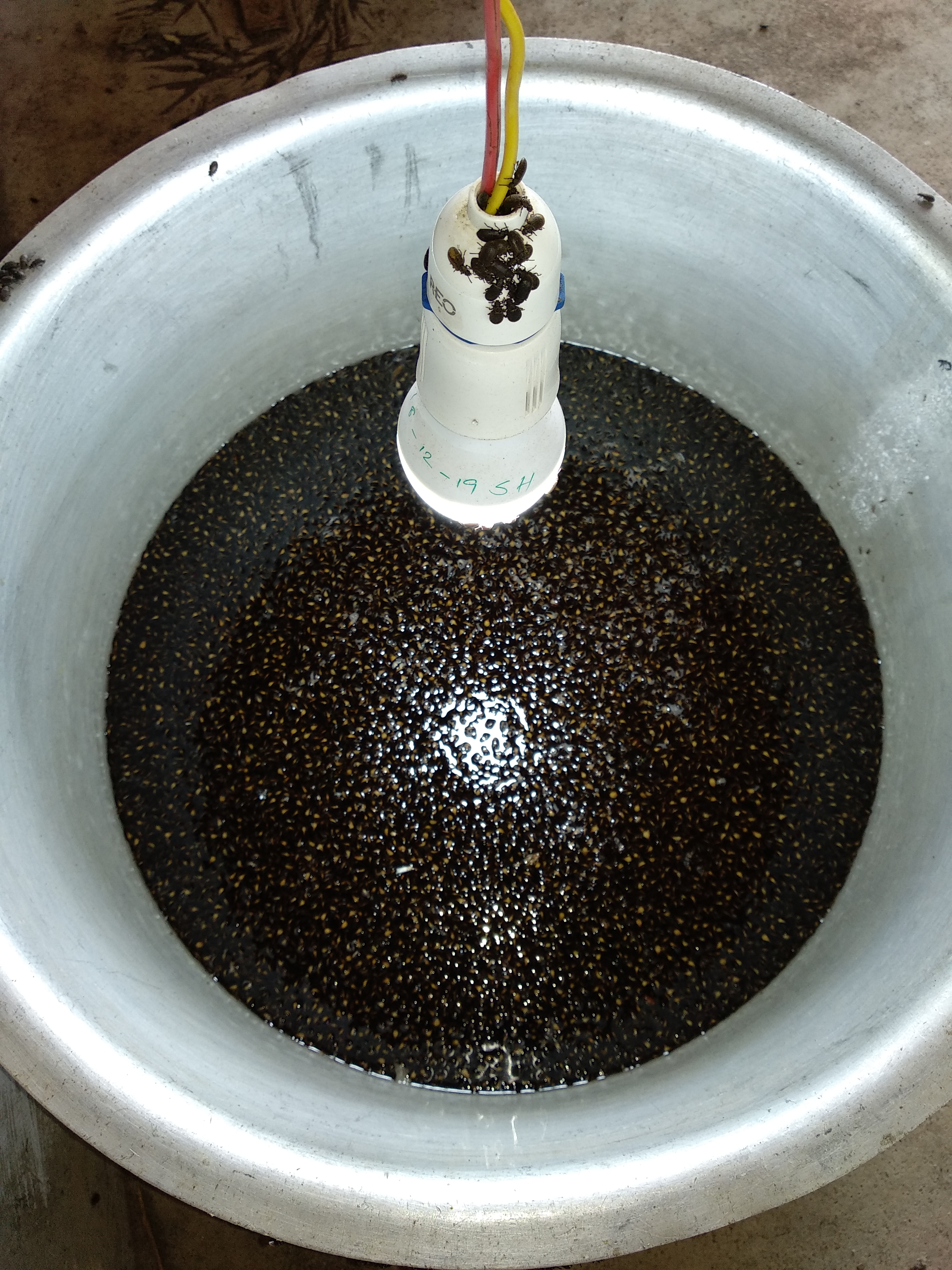
A mass of dead Mupli beetles caught in a day in a makeshift trap, Kerala, India. The trap consisted of an LED light hung over a detergent solution and left overnight during early summer rains.

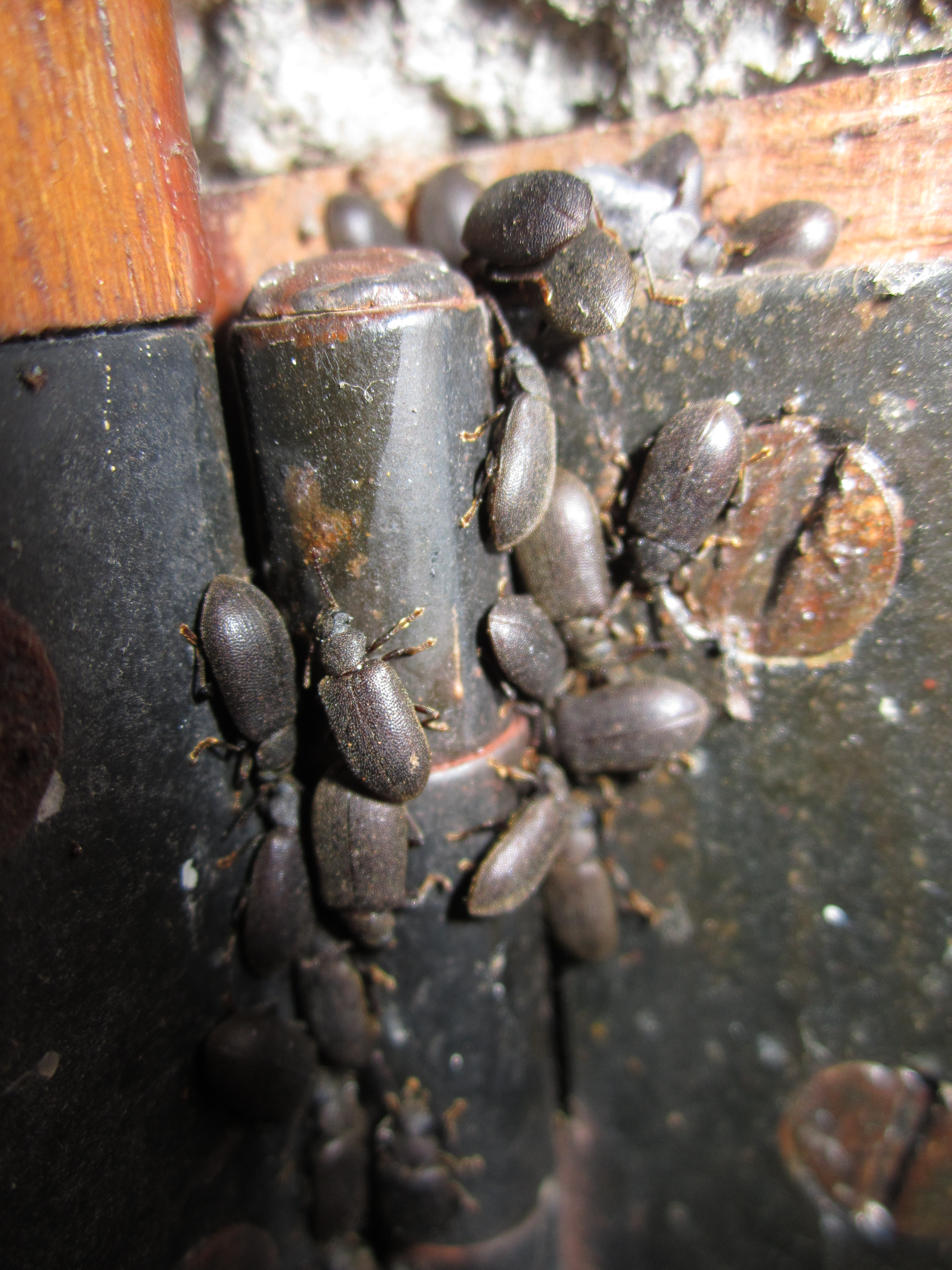
A few Mupli beetles found hiding in a door hinge, having invaded a home, mid-April.
