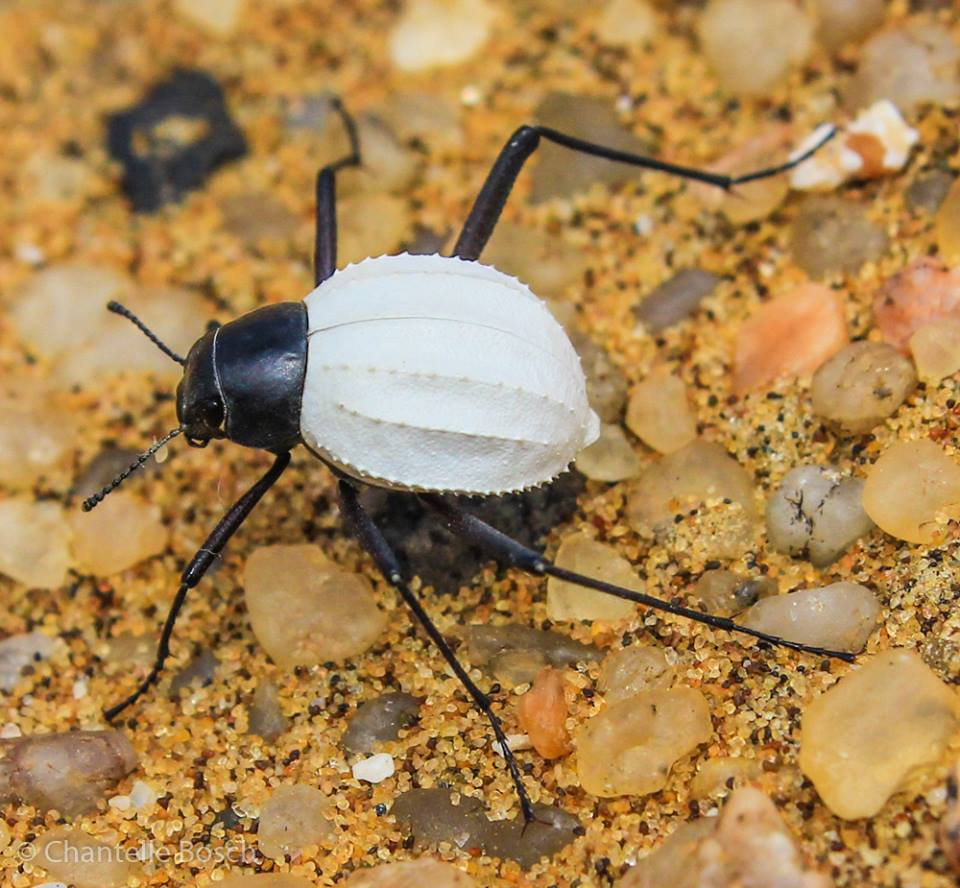
- C. eburnea outside of Swakopmund

Scientific classification
- Kingdom: Animalia
- Phylum: Arthropoda
- Clade: Pancrustacea
- Class: Insecta
- Order: Coleoptera
- Suborder: Polyphaga
- Infraorder: Cucujiformia
- Family: Tenebrionidae
- Genus: Cauricara
- Species: C. eburnea

Binomial name
- Cauricara eburnea (Pascoe, 1866)

Synonyms
- Adesmia eburnea Pascoe, 1866; Stenocara eburnea (Pascoe, 1866)

= Cauricara eburnea =

Species of beetle

Cauricara eburnea, formerly Stenocara eburnea, sometimes known as the long-legged white namib beetle, or white namib toktokkie, is a species of darkling beetle in the genus Cauricara.

== Appearance ==
Cauricara eburnea has a white torso, black head, and long legs. It also has black antennae from its head. Its long legs allow it to move fast.

== Diet ==
The diet of Cauricara eburnea presumably consists mainly of detritus.

== Distribution ==
Cauricara eburnea is native to Namibia in the Namib Desert, like many other species in the genus Cauricara. It is mostly found on the coast near Swakopmund. Some have been found on the coast of Angola.
