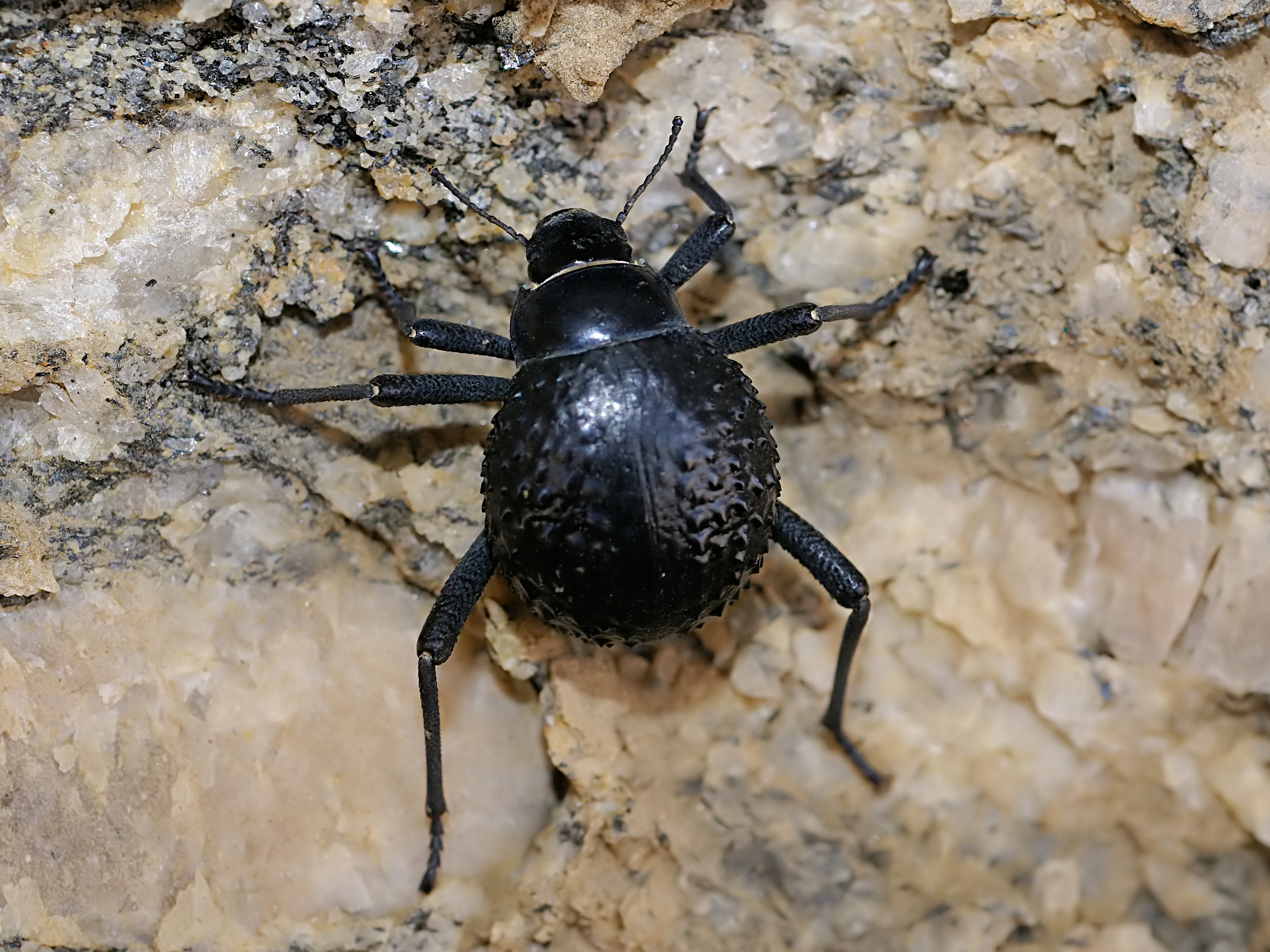

Scientific classification
- Kingdom: Animalia
- Phylum: Arthropoda
- Class: Insecta
- Order: Coleoptera
- Suborder: Polyphaga
- Infraorder: Cucujiformia
- Family: Tenebrionidae
- Genus: Stenocara
- Species: S. dentata

Binomial name
- Stenocara dentata Herbst, 1799

= Stenocara dentata =

Species of beetle

Stenocara dentata, the long-legged darkling beetle, is an insect of darkling beetle family found in southern Africa. The beetle stands in a head down posture on sand dunes to catch the morning mist which collects in drops on its body and slides into its mouth. It is large enough to crawl out of the trap of the plant, Hydnora africana, unlike smaller beetles which remain trapped for several days.
