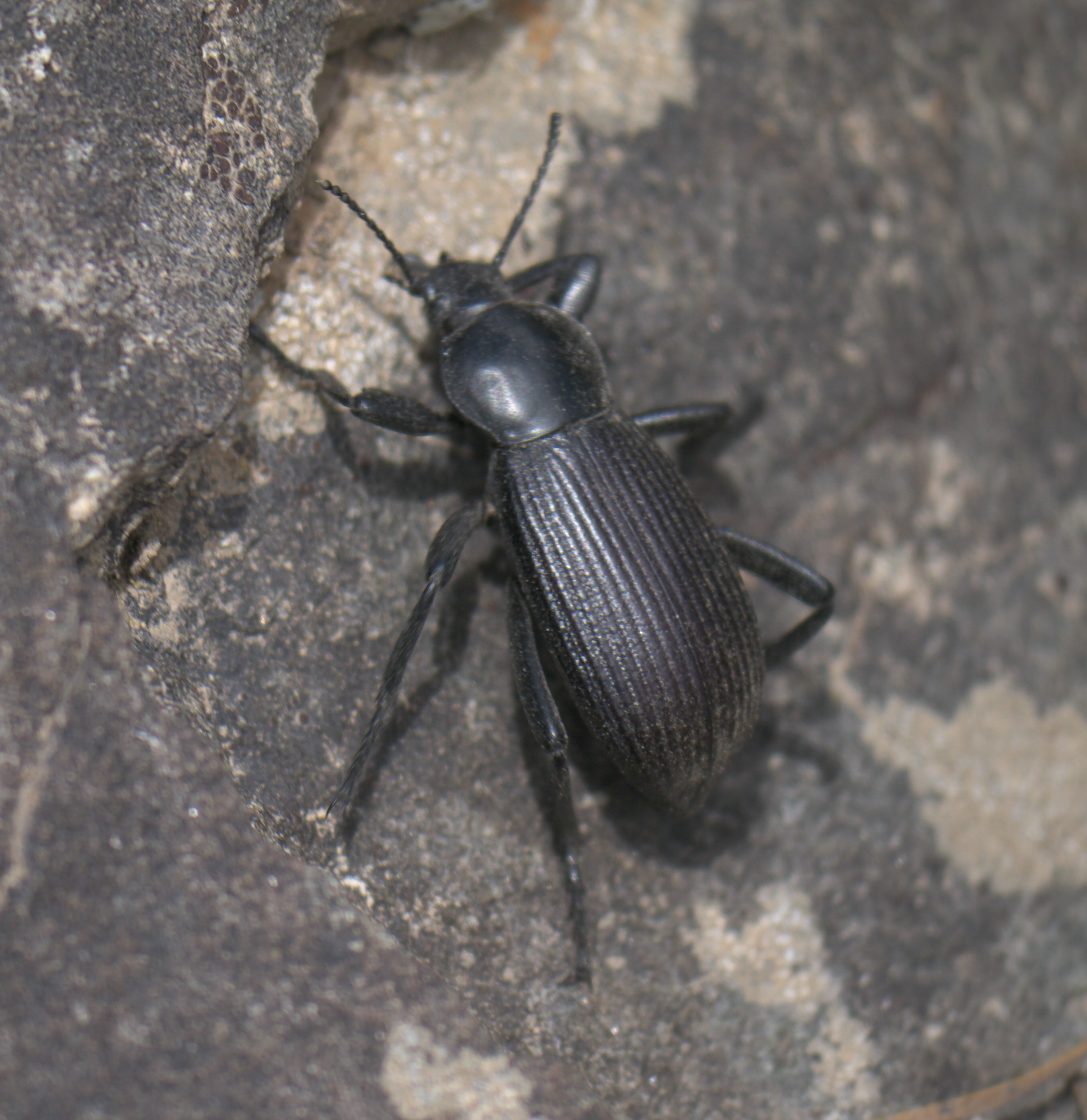

Scientific classification
- Kingdom: Animalia
- Phylum: Arthropoda
- Class: Insecta
- Order: Coleoptera
- Suborder: Polyphaga
- Infraorder: Cucujiformia
- Family: Tenebrionidae
- Genus: Eleodes
- Species: E. obscura

Binomial name
- Eleodes obscura (Say, 1824)

= Eleodes obscura =

Species of beetle

Eleodes obscura, commonly known as the obscure darkling beetle, is a species of darkling beetle in the genus Eleodes of western North America. It ranges from south-central British Columbia, eastern Washington and Oregon, south to northern Mexico and east to Nebraska, Kansas and Texas.

== Description ==
Eleodes obscura is dull, black, 23–31 mm (0.9–1.2 in) long with grooved elytra. Each front femur bears an anterior tooth near the tibia. The pronotum lacks obvious forward projections from the anterior corners.

The diet of Eleodes obscura includes dead plant material, animal remains, roots, and seeds.

== Gallery ==
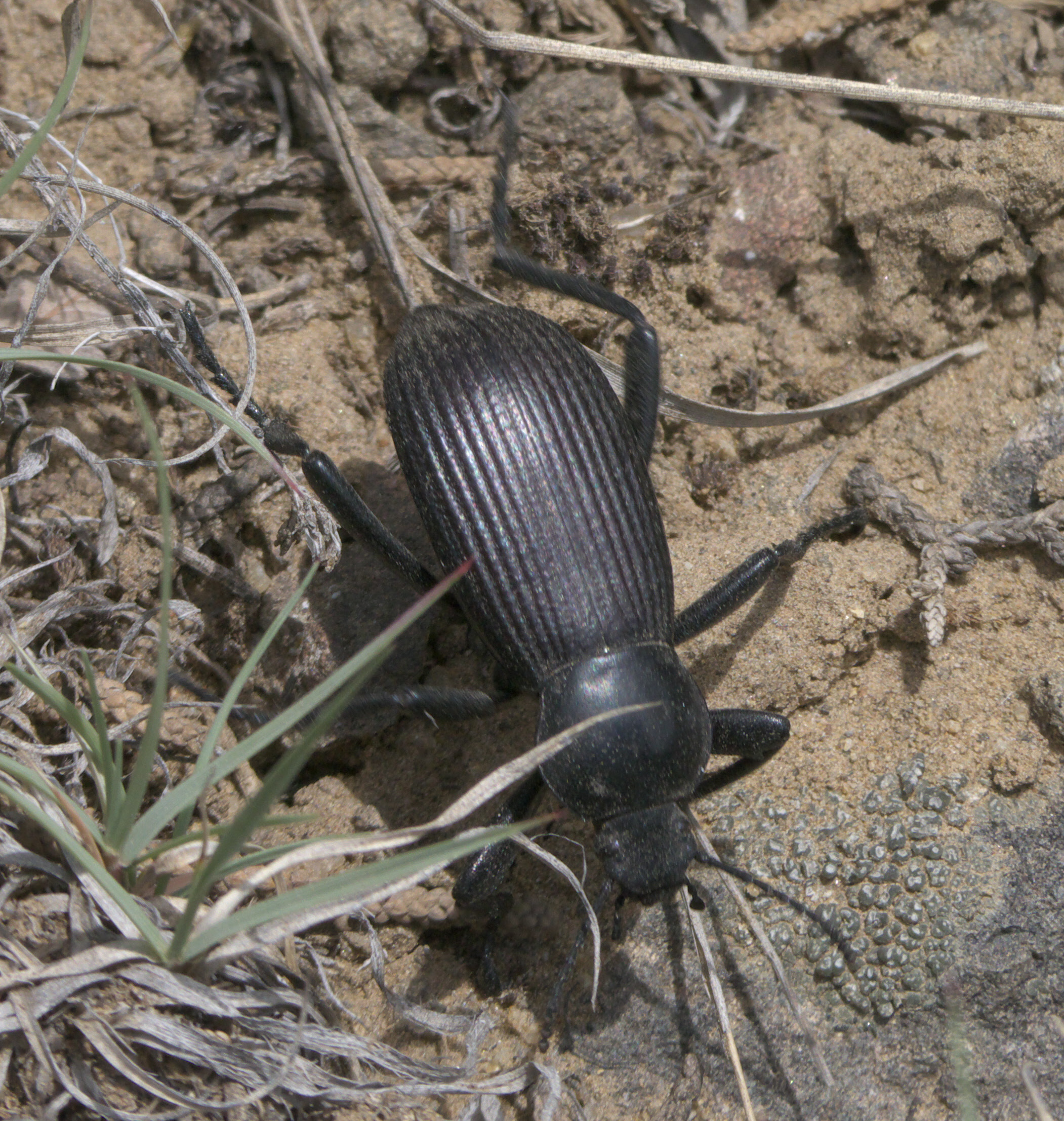

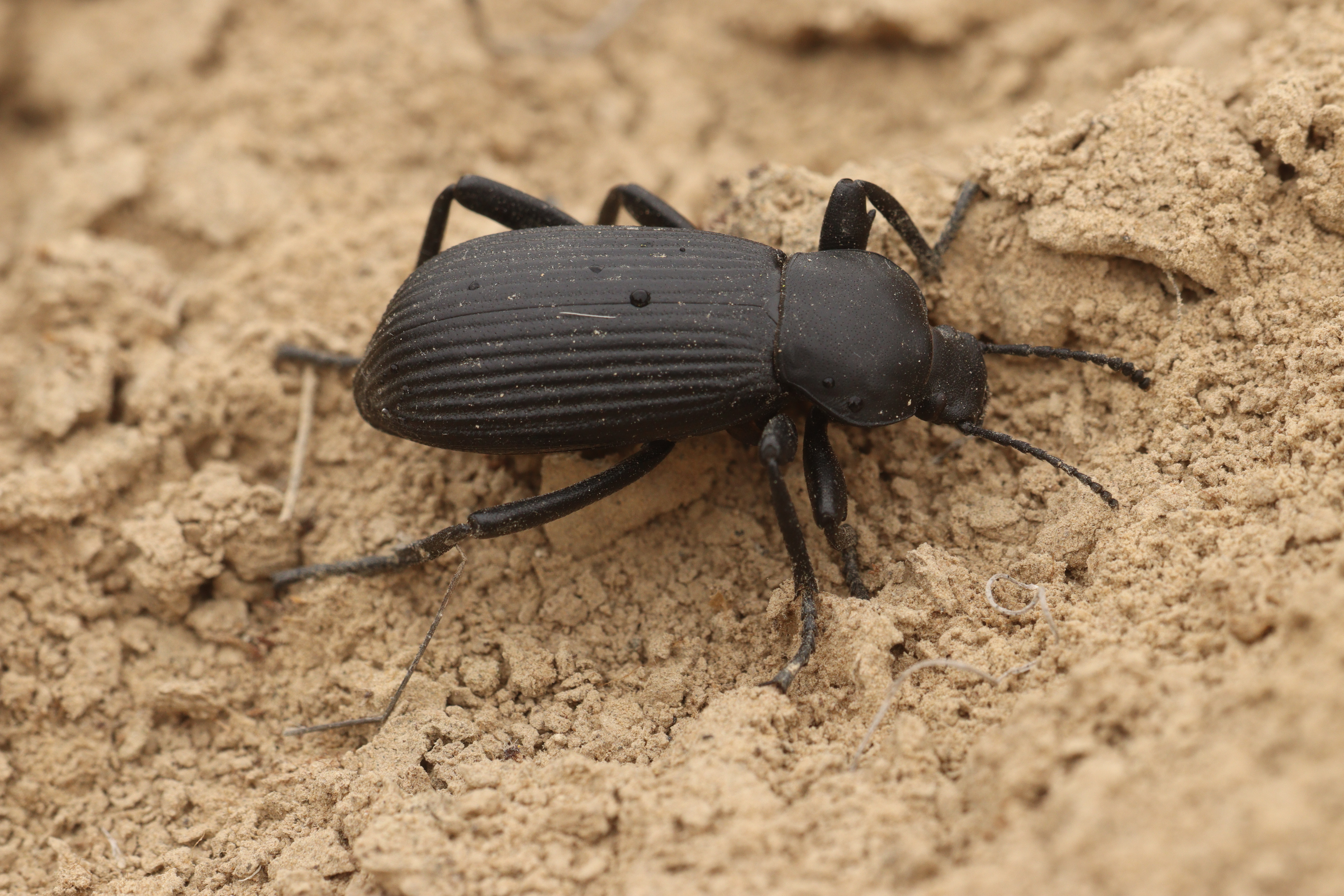

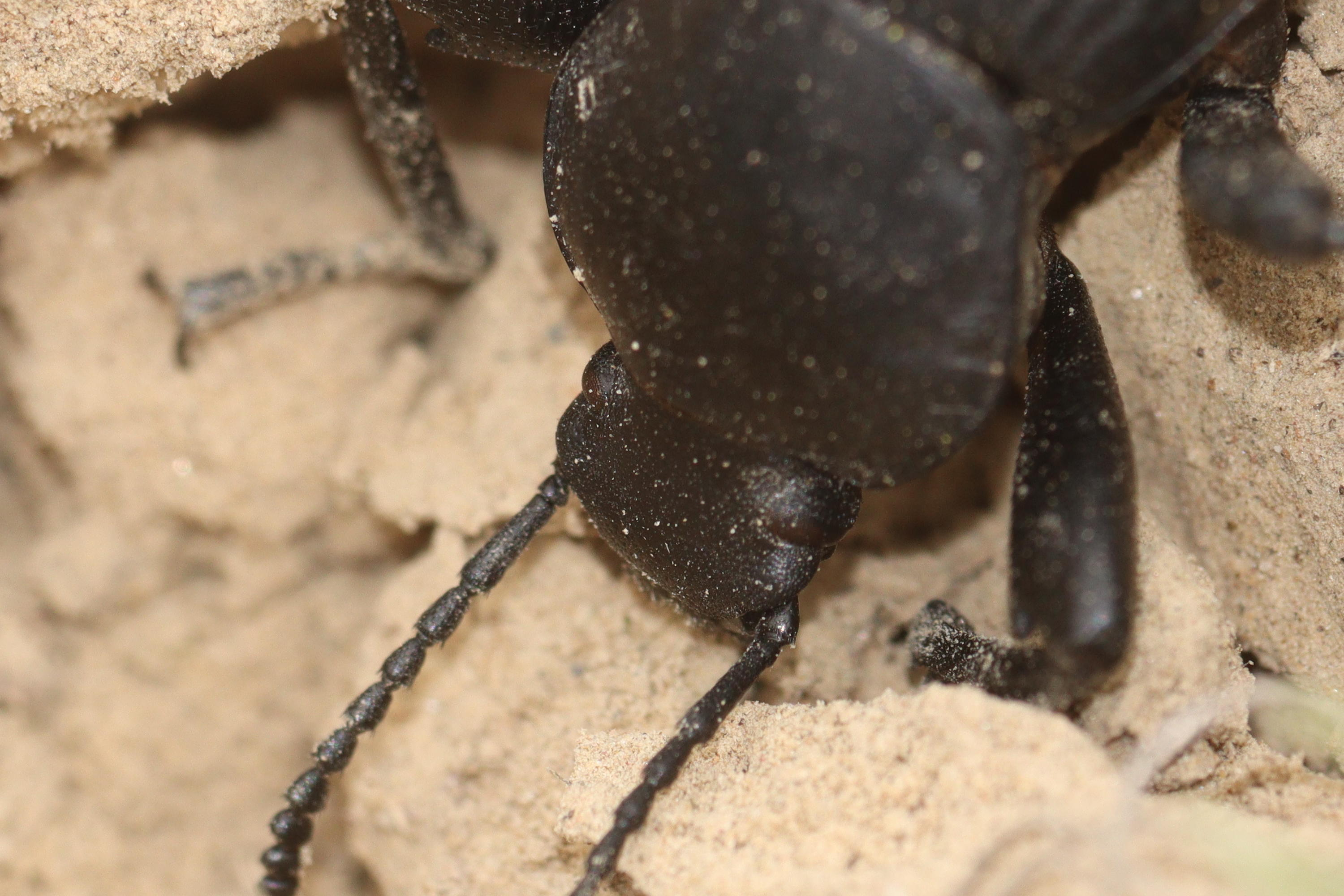
