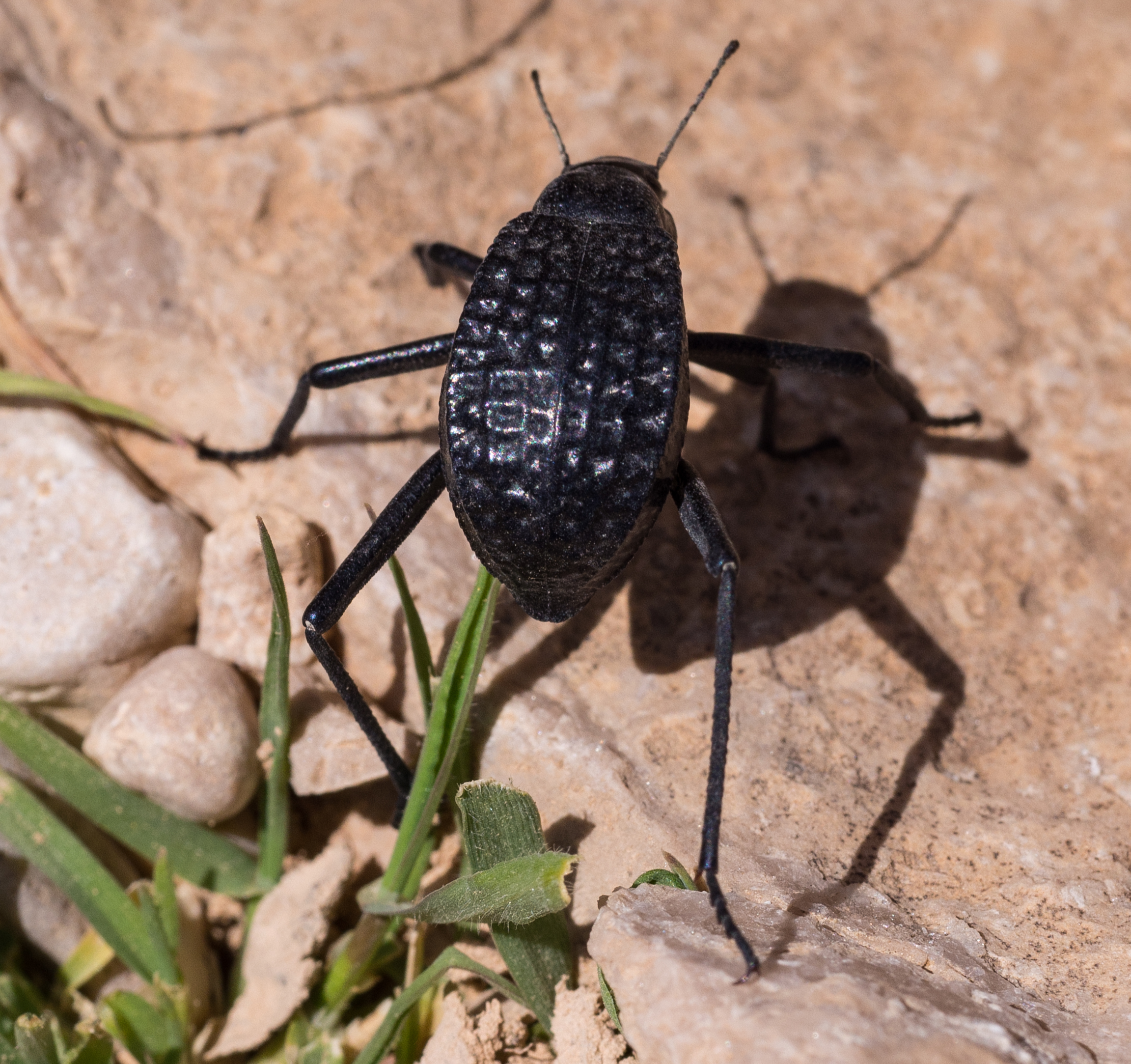
- Adesmia, Israel

Scientific classification
- Domain: Eukaryota
- Kingdom: Animalia
- Phylum: Arthropoda
- Class: Insecta
- Order: Coleoptera
- Suborder: Polyphaga
- Infraorder: Cucujiformia
- Family: Tenebrionidae
- Subfamily: Pimeliinae
- Tribe: Adesmiini; Lacordaire, 1859

= Adesmiini =

Tribe of darkling beetles

Adesmiini is a tribe of darkling beetles in the subfamily Pimeliinae of the family Tenebrionidae. There are about 11 genera in Adesmiini, found primarily in tropical Africa.

== Genera ==
These genera belong to the tribe Adesmiini:

- Adesmia Fischer von Waldheim, 1822 (the Palearctic, tropical Africa, and Indomalaya)
- Alogenius Gebien, 1910 (tropical Africa)
- Epiphysa Dejean, 1834 (tropical Africa)
- Eustolopus Gebien, 1938 (tropical Africa)
- Metriopus Solier, 1835 (tropical Africa)
- Onymacris Allard, 1885 (tropical Africa)
- Orientocara Koch, 1952 (tropical Africa)
- Physadesmia Penrith, 1979 (tropical Africa)
- Renatiella Koch, 1944 (tropical Africa)
- Stenocara Solier, 1835 (tropical Africa)
- Stenodesia Reitter, 1916 (tropical Africa)
