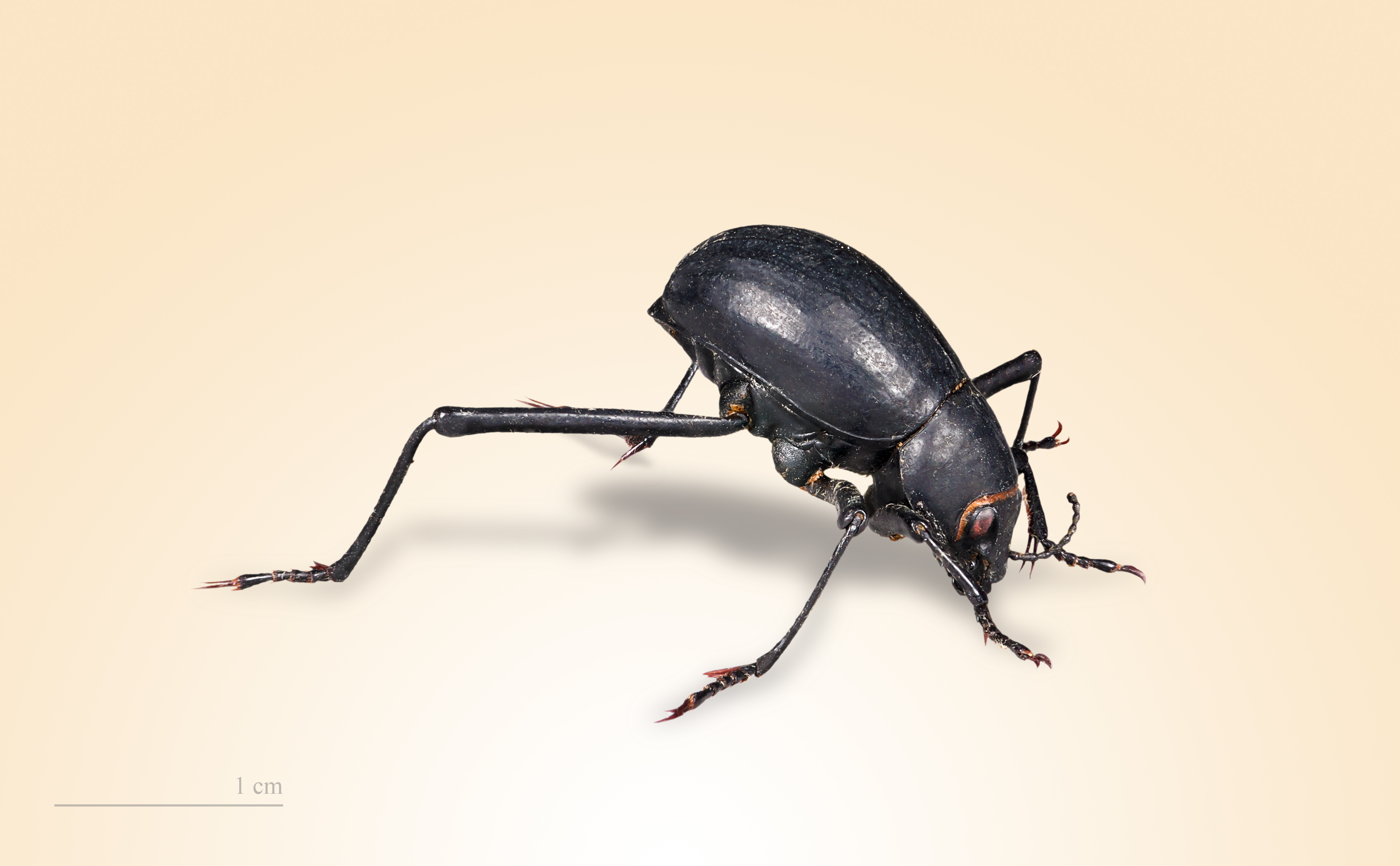
- Onymacris unguicularis (Tenebrioninae: Adesmiini); Scale bar (bottom left) is 10 mm

Scientific classification
- Kingdom: Animalia
- Phylum: Arthropoda
- Clade: Pancrustacea
- Class: Insecta
- Order: Coleoptera
- Suborder: Polyphaga
- Infraorder: Cucujiformia
- Superfamily: Tenebrionoidea
- Family: Tenebrionidae; Latreille, 1802

Subfamilies
- See text

Synonyms
- Alleculidae

= Darkling beetle =

Darkling beetle Temporal range: Late Jurassic–Recent

Family of beetles

Darkling beetle is the common name for members of the beetle family Tenebrionidae, comprising over 20,000 species in a cosmopolitan distribution.

== Taxonomy ==
Tenebrio is the Latin generic name that Carl Linnaeus assigned to some flour beetles in his 10th edition of Systema Naturae 1758–59. The name means "lover of darkness"; the English language term 'darkling' means "characterised by darkness or obscurity"; see also English 'tenebrous', figuratively "obscure, gloomy".

Many Tenebrionidae species inhabit dark places; in genera such as Stenocara and Onymacris, they are active by day and inactive at night.

The family covers a varied range of forms, such that classification presents great difficulties. These eleven subfamilies were listed in the 2021 review by Bouchard, Bousquet, et al., updating a similar catalog from 2005.

- Alleculinae Laporte, 1840
- Blaptinae Leach, 1815
- Diaperinae Latreille, 1802
- Kuhitangiinae G.S. Medvedev, 1962
- Lagriinae Latreille, 1825
- Nilioninae Oken, 1843
- Phrenapatinae Solier, 1834
- Pimeliinae Latreille, 1802
- Stenochiinae Kirby, 1837
- Tenebrioninae Latreille, 1802
- Zolodininae Watt, 1975

Ongoing phylogenetic studies are showing that some taxonomic changes are needed. For instance the tribal classification of tribe Pedinini has recently been altered.

The misspelling "Terebrionidae" occurs frequently enough to be easily overlooked. The error appears to have no particular significance, but to be the product of misreadings, mis-scans and mis-typings.

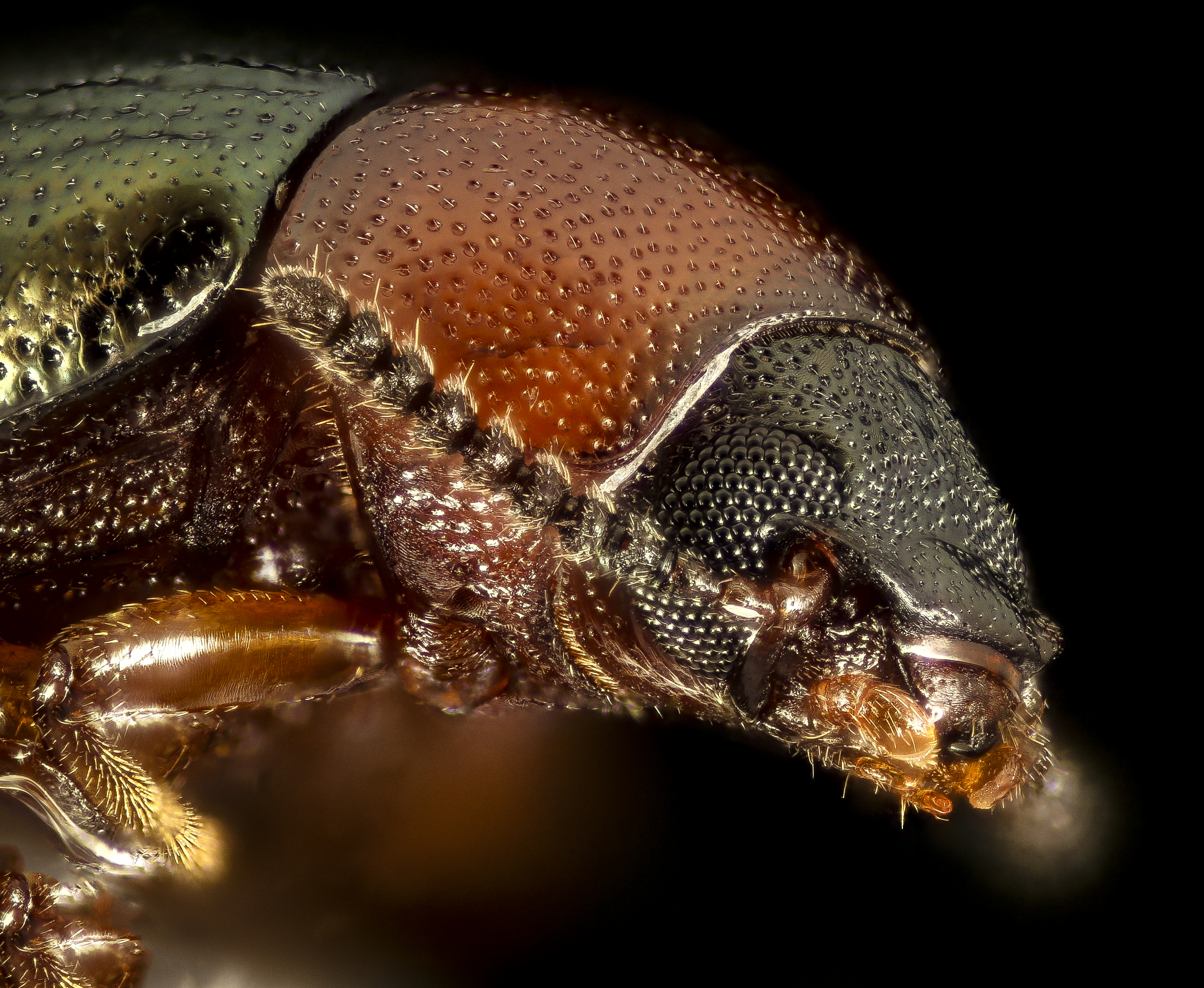
Tenebrionidae head

The oldest known member of the family is Jurallecula from the Late Jurassic Karabastau Formation of Kazakhstan, assigned to the subfamily Alleculinae.

== Characteristics ==
The Tenebrionidae may be identified by a combination of features, including:

- Their eleven-segmented antennae that may be filiform, moniliform or weakly clubbed
- First abdominal sternite is entire and not divided by the hind coxae
- Eyes notched by a frontal ridge
- Four segments in the hind pair of tarsi and five in the fore and mid-legs (5–5–4), with simple claws

== Biology and ecology ==
Tenebrionid beetles occupy ecological niches in mainly deserts and forests as plant scavengers. Most species are generalistic omnivores, and feed on decaying leaves, rotting wood, fresh plant matter, dead insects, and fungi as larvae and adults. Several genera, including Bolitotherus, are specialized fungivores which feed on polypores. Many of the larger species are flightless, and those that are capable, such as T. molitor, often rarely do so.

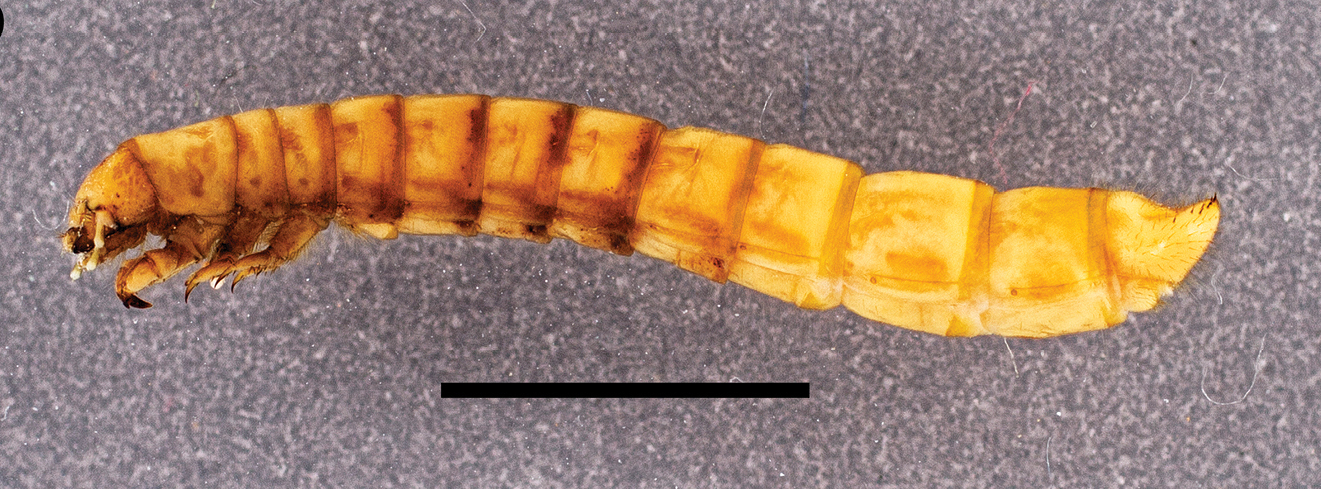
A tenebrionid larva (Eleodes sp.)

The larvae, known as mealworms or false wireworms, are usually fossorial, heavily sclerotized and nocturnal. They may possibly be an important resource for certain invertebrates and small mammals. Adults of many species have chemical defenses and are relatively protected against predators. Adults of most species, except grain pests, have slow metabolisms, and live long lives compared to other insects, ranging from approximately six months to two years.

Some species live in intensely dry deserts such as the Namib, and have evolved adaptions by which they collect droplets of fog that deposit on their elytra. As the droplets accumulate the water drains down the beetles' backs to their mouthparts, where they swallow it.

Humans spread some species such that they have become cosmopolitan, such as Tribolium castaneum, the red flour beetle, which was spread through grain products.

== Notable types ==
The larval stages of several species are cultured as feeder insects for captive insectivores or as laboratory subjects:

- Tenebrio molitor, or mealworm, is commonly used to feed terrestrial amniotes kept in terraria.
- Tribolium castaneum is a laboratory animal useful as a model organism, especially in studies of intragenomic conflict and population ecology.
- Zophobas morio, or superworm, is valued as a feed for captive reptiles; it contains less chitin than Tenebrio molitor.
- Alphitobius diaperinus, lesser mealworm
- Many tenebrionids are pests of cereal and flour silos and other storage facilities, including T. castaneum, other Tribolium species such as Tribolium confusum and Tribolium destructor, and Gnatocerus cornutus.
- In southwestern North America, species of the genus Eleodes (particularly E. obscura) are well known as "pinacate beetles" or "desert stink beetles".
- Several genera, such as Stenocara and Onymacris, are of interest in ecological studies of arid conditions and their associated adaptations.
- Ulomoides dermestoides, known as "Chinese weevil", "peanut beetle", "cancer beetle", or "asthma beetle", is eaten in Argentina where it is thought to be a treatment for cancer, asthma, and other illnesses.
- Luprops tristis is found in India, where it is known as the Mupli beetle. It is notorious for a defensive secretion that causes skin burns. Since they congregate in large numbers, they can easily become a pest.

== Gallery ==
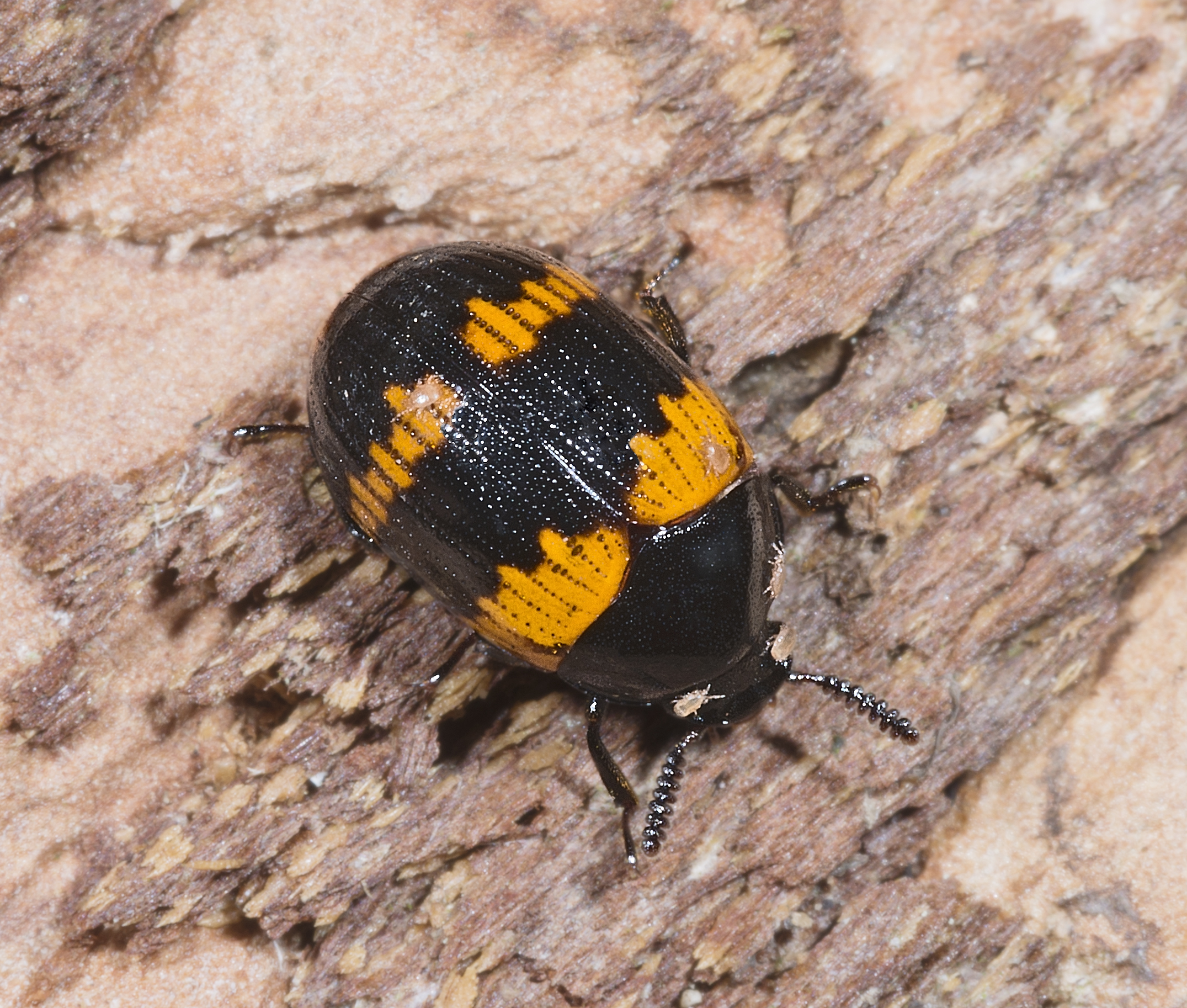
Diaperis boleti under bark of oak

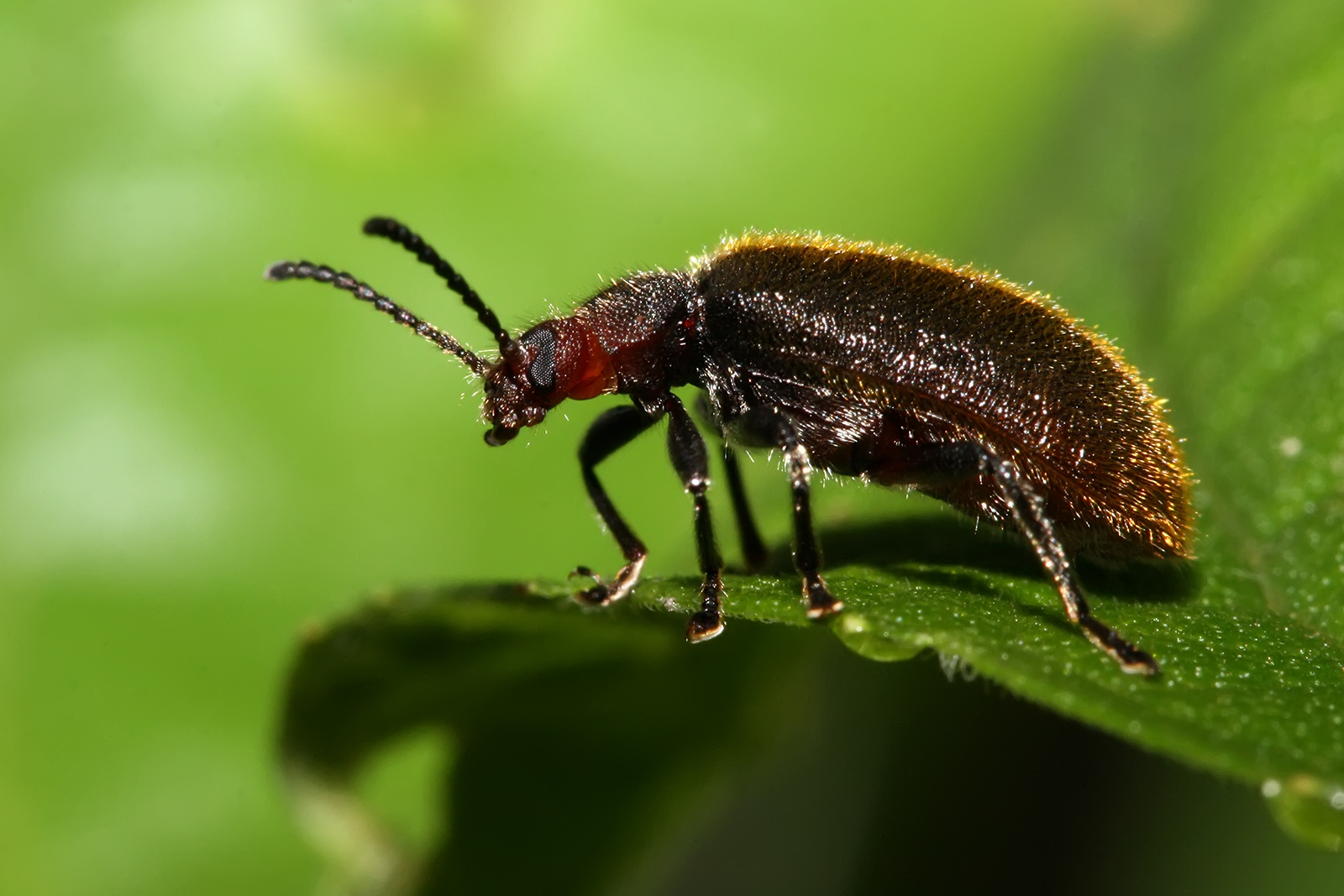
Lagria sp. (Lagriinae) in Tanzania

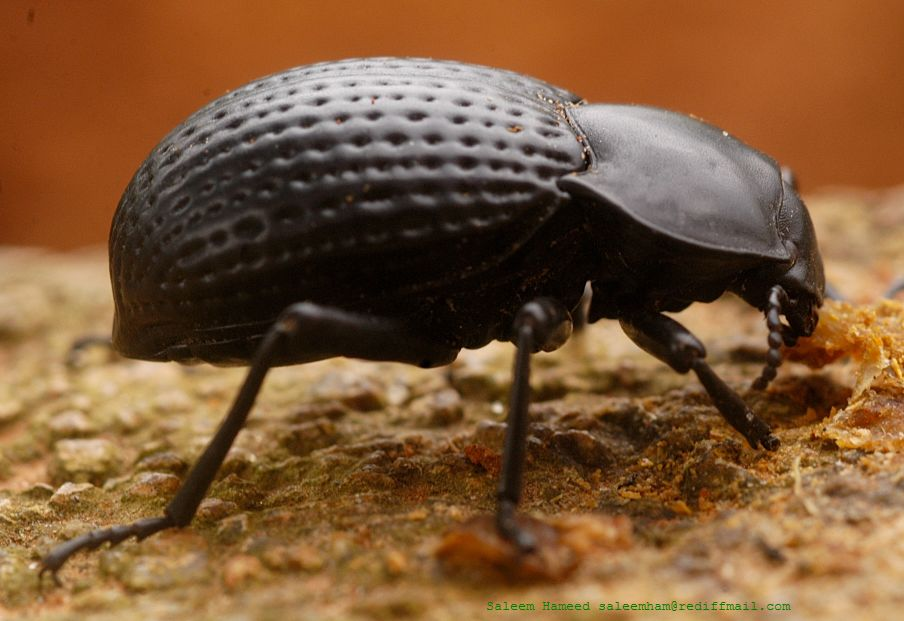
Platynotus excavatus, India

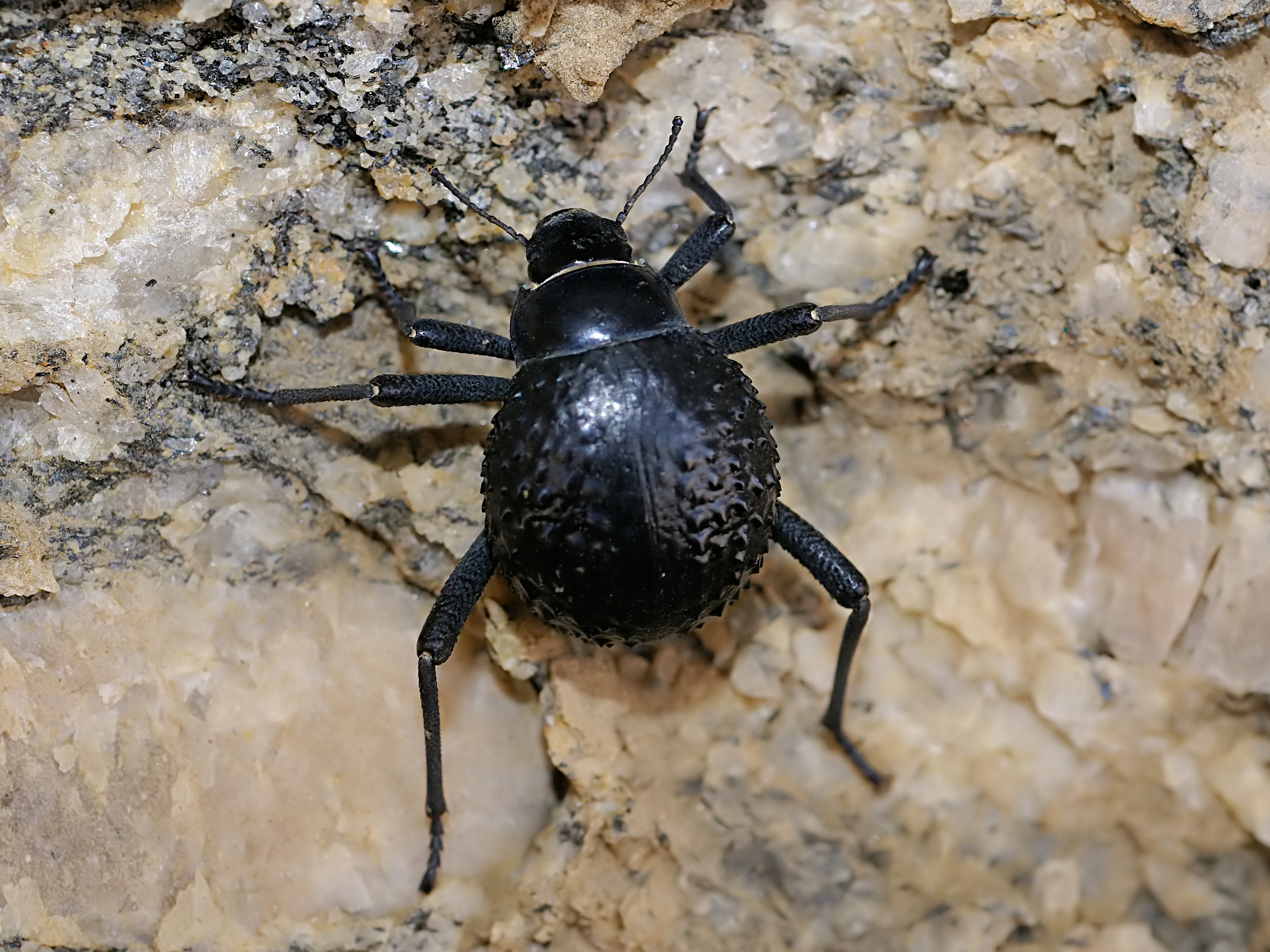
Stenocara dentata in southern Africa

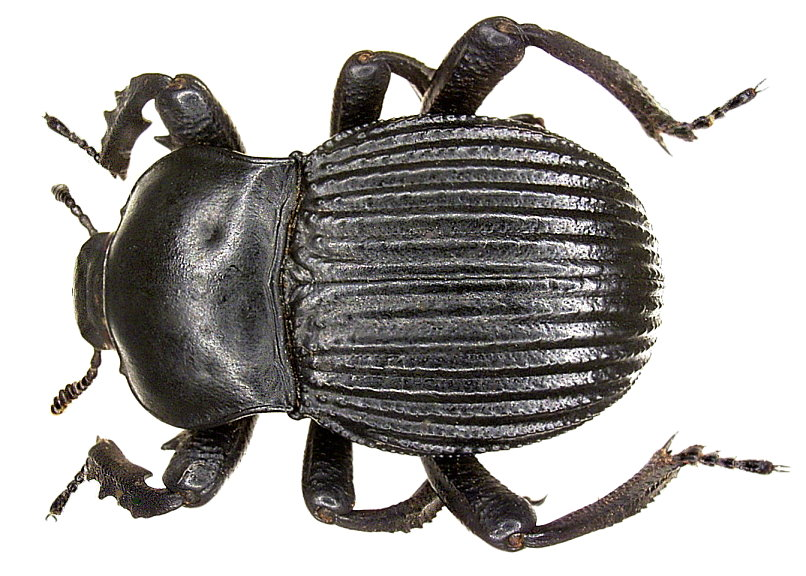
Gonopus tibialis

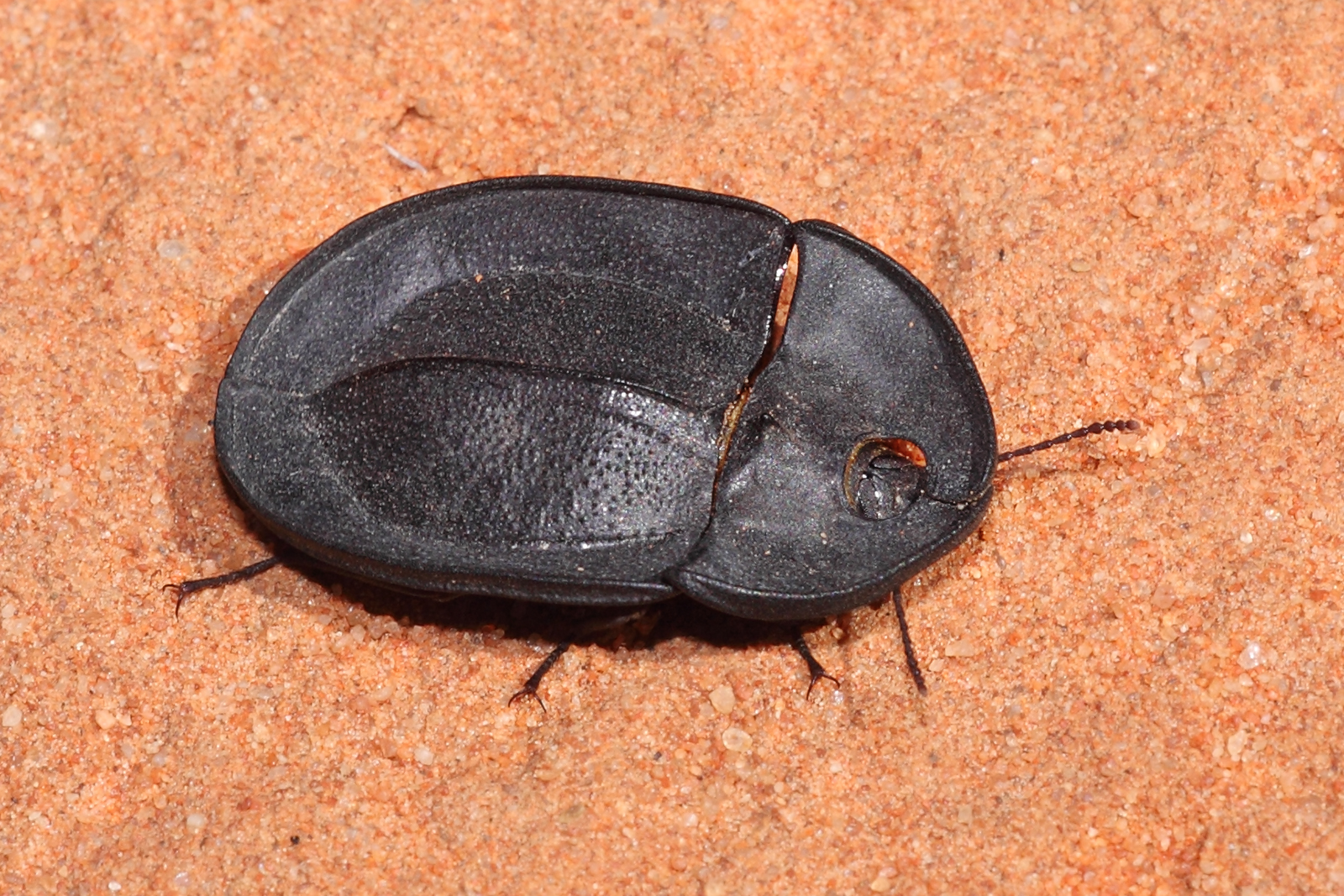
Pie dish beetle, Helea sp. in Australia

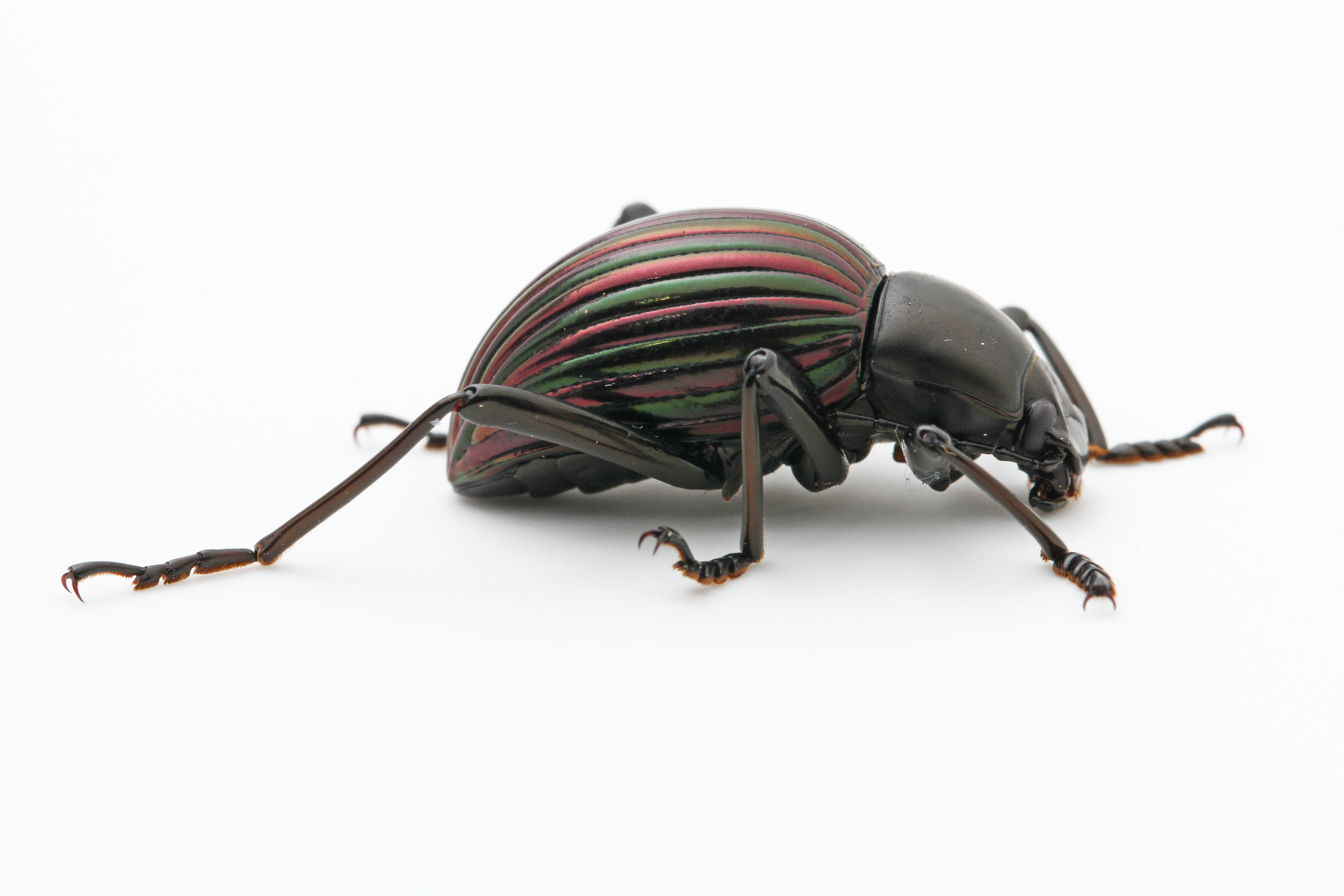
Hegemona sp. (De Laporte, 1840) from Belize

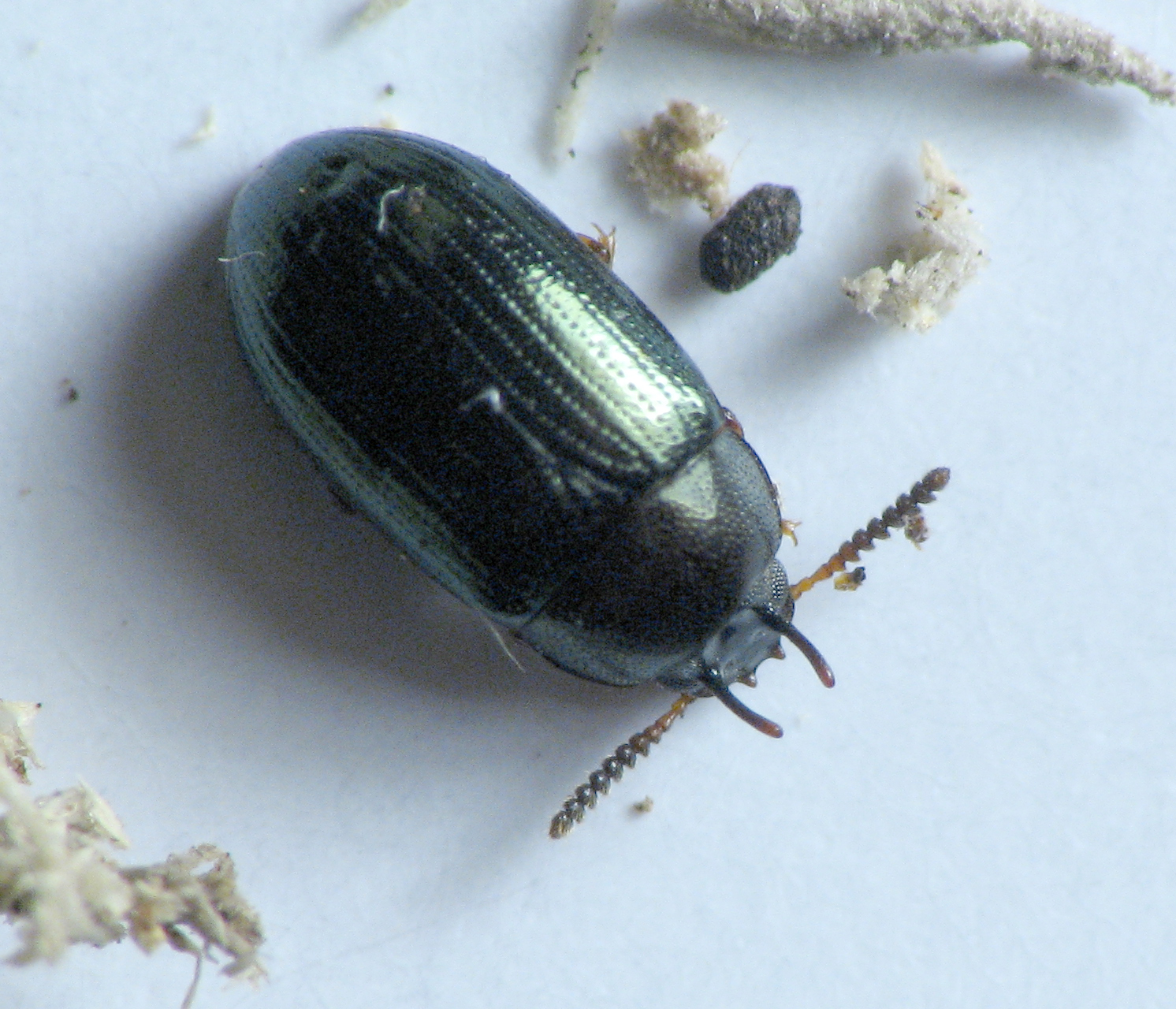
Neomida bicornis, male

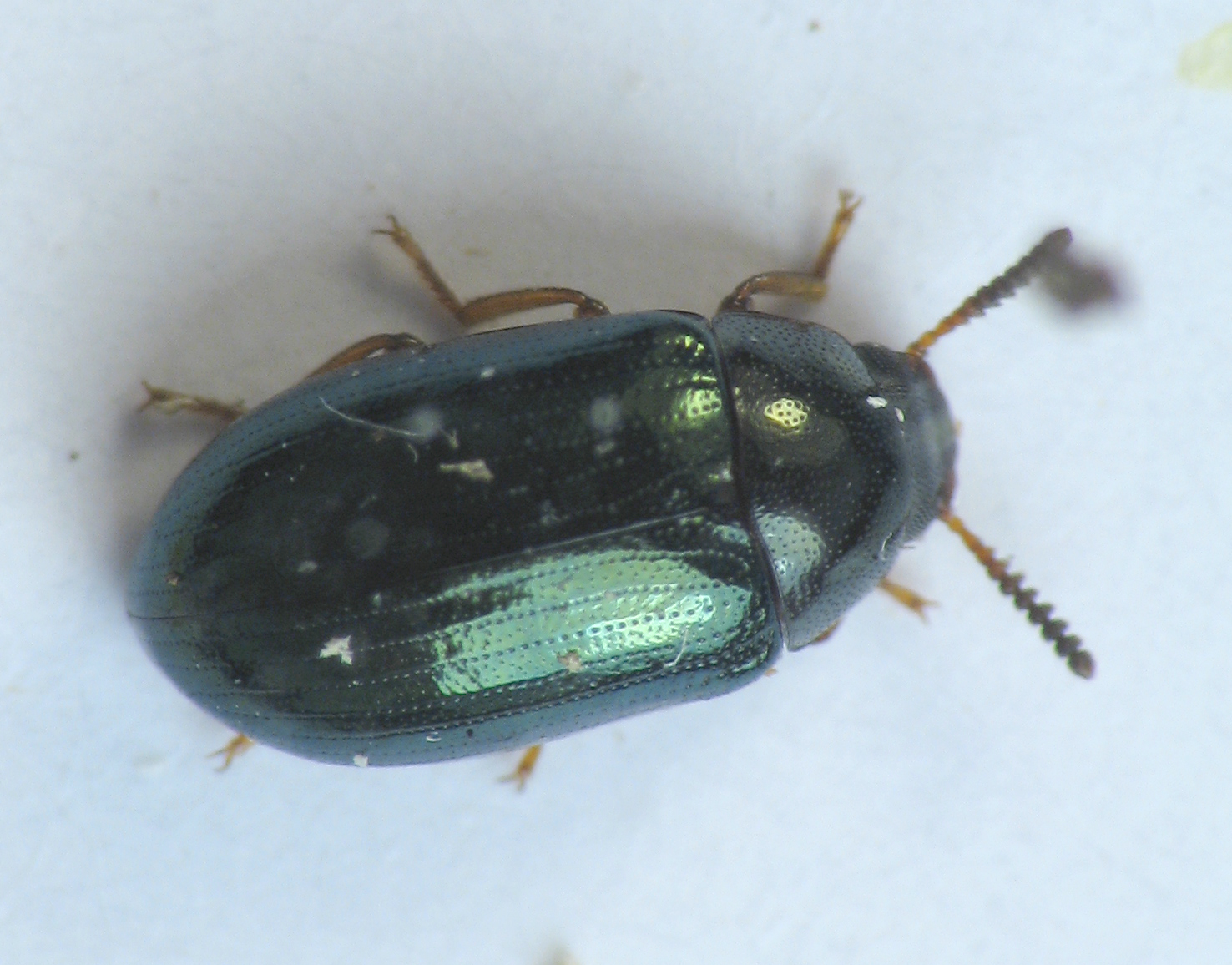
Neomida bicornis, female

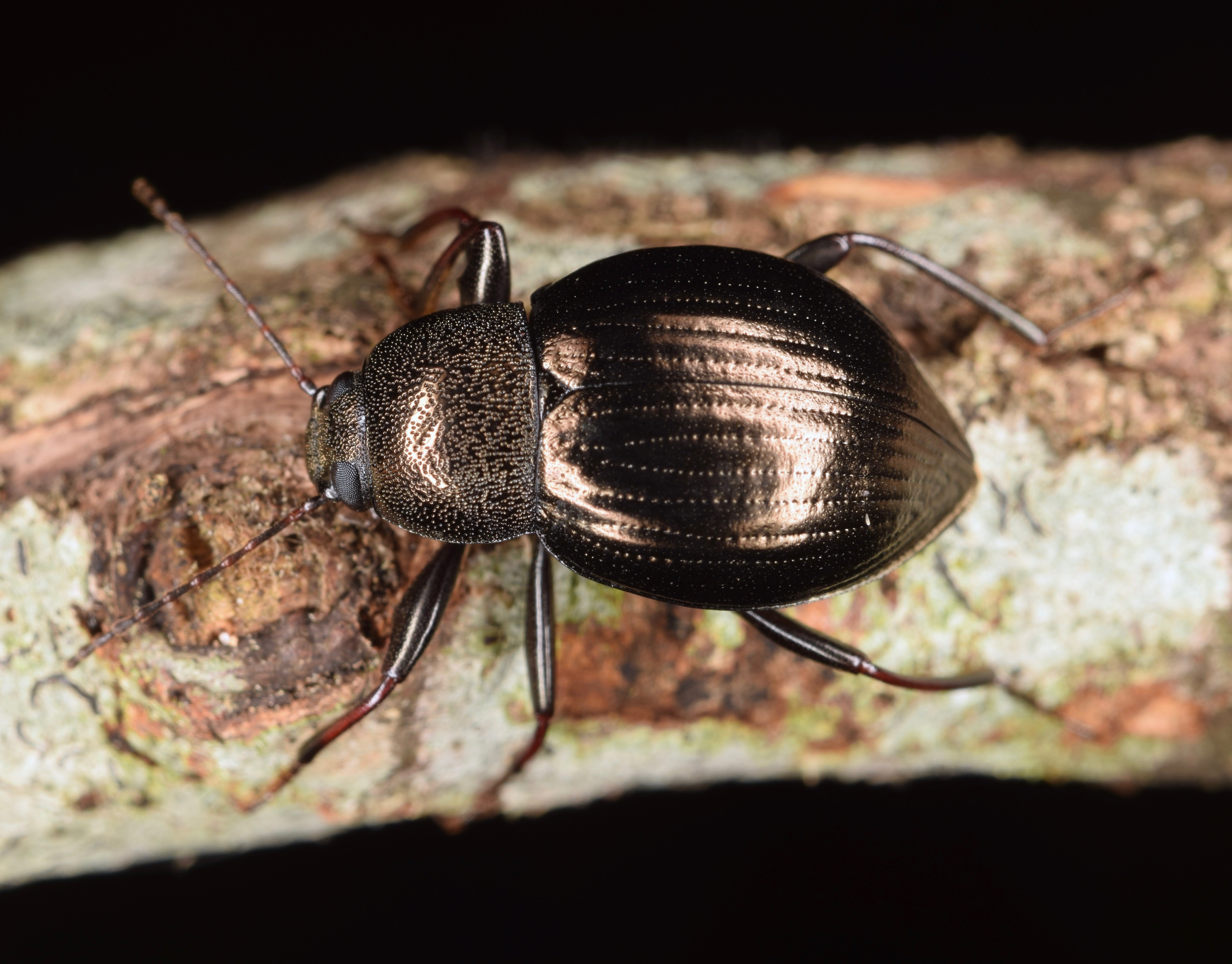
Meracantha contracta, US
