= Thinobatini =

Scientific classification
- Domain: Eukaryota
- Kingdom: Animalia
- Phylum: Arthropoda
- Class: Insecta
- Order: Coleoptera
- Suborder: Polyphaga
- Infraorder: Cucujiformia
- Family: Tenebrionidae
- Subfamily: Pimeliinae
- Tribe: Thinobatini; Lacordaire, 1859

Tribe of beetles

Thinobatini is a tribe of darkling beetles in the subfamily Pimeliinae of the family Tenebrionidae. There are at least two genera in Thinobatini, found in the Neotropics.

== Genera ==
These genera belong to the tribe Thinobatini

- Cordibates Kulzer, 1956
- Thinobatis Eschscholtz, 1831
