= Vacronini =

Scientific classification
- Domain: Eukaryota
- Kingdom: Animalia
- Phylum: Arthropoda
- Class: Insecta
- Order: Coleoptera
- Suborder: Polyphaga
- Infraorder: Cucujiformia
- Family: Tenebrionidae
- Subfamily: Pimeliinae
- Tribe: Vacronini; Gebien, 1910

Tribe of beetles

Vacronini is a tribe of darkling beetles in the subfamily Pimeliinae of the family Tenebrionidae. There are at least four genera in Vacronini.

== Genera ==
These genera belong to the tribe Vacronini

- Alaephus Horn, 1870 (North America)
- Eupsophulus Cockerell, 1906 (North America)
- Exangeltus Blackburn, 1897 (Australasia)
- Lixionica Blackburn, 1896 (Australasia)
