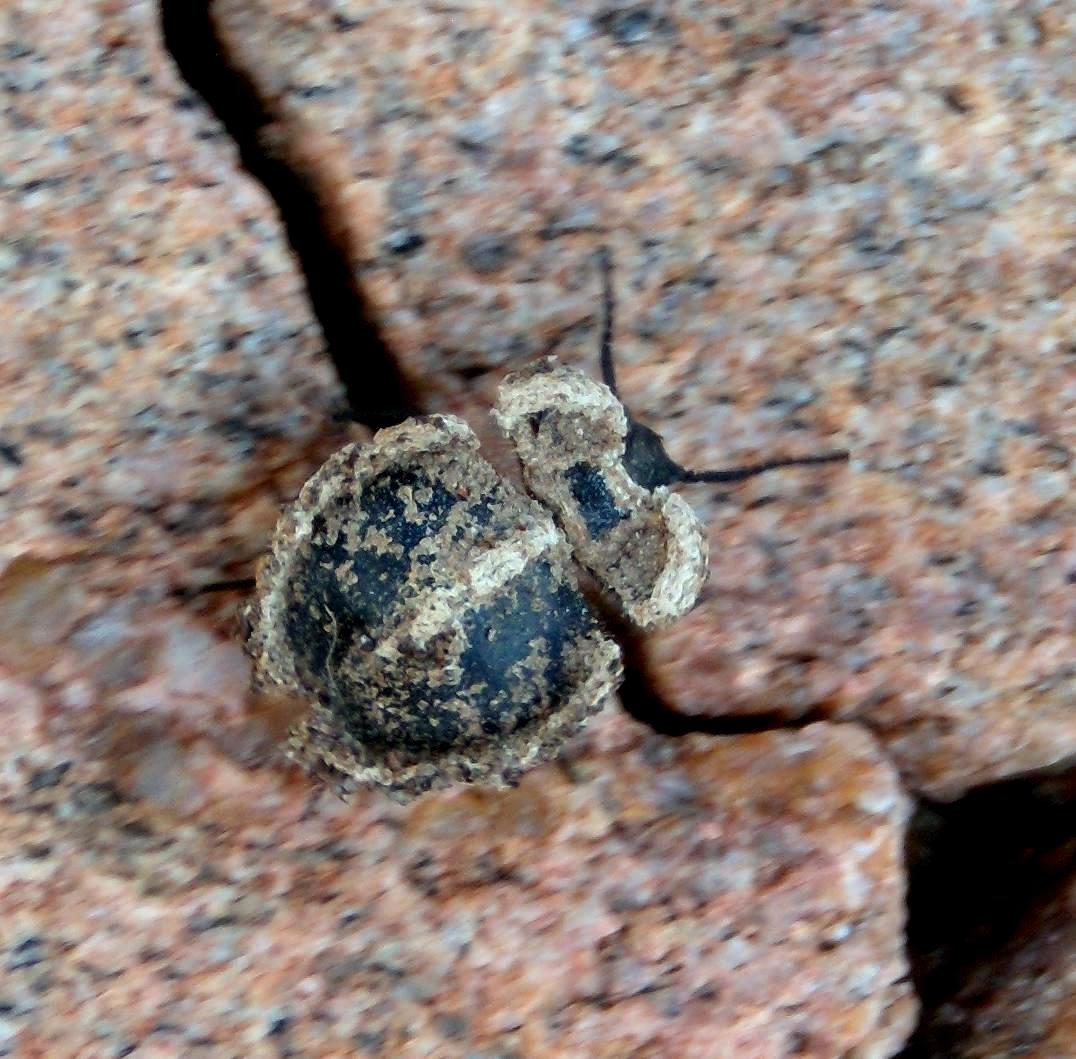
- Eurychora, Namibia

Scientific classification
- Domain: Eukaryota
- Kingdom: Animalia
- Phylum: Arthropoda
- Class: Insecta
- Order: Coleoptera
- Suborder: Polyphaga
- Infraorder: Cucujiformia
- Family: Tenebrionidae
- Subfamily: Pimeliinae
- Tribe: Adelostomini; Solier, 1834

= Adelostomini =

Tribe of darkling beetles

Adelostomini is a tribe of darkling beetles in the subfamily Pimeliinae of the family Tenebrionidae. There are more than 30 genera in Adelostomini, found primarily in tropical Africa.

== Genera ==
These genera belong to the tribe Adelostomini:

- Acanthioides Fairmaire, 1894 (tropical Africa)
- Acestophanus Koch, 1950 (tropical Africa)
- Adelostoma Duponchel, 1827 (the Palearctic and tropical Africa)
- Argasidus Péringuey, 1899 (tropical Africa)
- Arthrochora Gebien, 1938 (tropical Africa)
- Aspilomorpha Koch, 1952 (tropical Africa)
- Basilewskyum Koch, 1952 (tropical Africa)
- Brachymoschium Fairmaire, 1896 (tropical Africa)
- Carinosella Purchart, 2010 (tropical Africa)
- Cimicia Fairmaire, 1891 (tropical Africa)
- Cimicichora Koch, 1952 (tropical Africa)
- Cimiciopsis Koch, 1952 (tropical Africa)
- Eurychora Thunberg, 1789 (tropical Africa)
- Eurychorula Koch, 1952 (tropical Africa)
- Eutichus Haag-Rutenberg, 1875 (tropical Africa)
- Geophanus Haag-Rutenberg, 1875 (tropical Africa)
- Herpsis Haag-Rutenberg, 1875 (tropical Africa)
- Lepidochora Koch, 1952 (tropical Africa)
- Lycanthropa J. Thomson, 1860 (tropical Africa)
- Machlopsis Pomel, 1871 (the Palearctic and tropical Africa)
- Phytolostoma Koch, 1952 (tropical Africa)
- Platyphanus Koch, 1952 (tropical Africa)
- Platysemodes Strand, 1935 (tropical Africa)
- Pogonobasis Solier, 1837 (the Palearctic and tropical Africa)
- Pogonocanta Koch, 1952 (tropical Africa)
- Prunaspila Koch, 1950 (tropical Africa)
- Psaryphis Erichson, 1843 (tropical Africa)
- Serrichora Koch, 1952 (tropical Africa)
- Smiliophanus Koch, 1950 (tropical Africa)
- Steptochora Koch, 1952 (tropical Africa)
- Stips Koch, 1950 (tropical Africa)
- Stipsostoma Koch, 1952 (tropical Africa)
- Symphochora Koch, 1952 (tropical Africa)
