= Ceratanisini =

Scientific classification
- Domain: Eukaryota
- Kingdom: Animalia
- Phylum: Arthropoda
- Class: Insecta
- Order: Coleoptera
- Suborder: Polyphaga
- Infraorder: Cucujiformia
- Family: Tenebrionidae
- Subfamily: Pimeliinae
- Tribe: Ceratanisini; Gebien, 1937

Tribe of darkling beetles

Ceratanisini is a tribe of darkling beetles in the subfamily Pimeliinae of the family Tenebrionidae. There are at least two genera in Ceratanisini.

== Genera ==
These genera belong to the tribe Ceratanisini

- Ceratanisus Gemminger, 1870 (the Palearctic)
- Tenebriocephalon Pic, 1925 (Indomalaya)
