= Physogasterini =

Scientific classification
- Domain: Eukaryota
- Kingdom: Animalia
- Phylum: Arthropoda
- Class: Insecta
- Order: Coleoptera
- Suborder: Polyphaga
- Infraorder: Cucujiformia
- Family: Tenebrionidae
- Subfamily: Pimeliinae
- Tribe: Physogasterini; Lacordaire, 1859

Tribe of beetles

Physogasterini is a tribe of darkling beetles in the subfamily Pimeliinae of the family Tenebrionidae. There are about five genera in Physogasterini, found in the Neotropics.

== Genera ==
These genera belong to the tribe Physogasterini

- Entomochilus Gay & Solier, 1843
- Philorea Erichson, 1834
- Physogaster Lacordaire, 1830
- Physogasterinus Kaszab, 1981
- Pimelosomus Burmeister, 1875
