= Cossyphodini =

Scientific classification
- Domain: Eukaryota
- Kingdom: Animalia
- Phylum: Arthropoda
- Class: Insecta
- Order: Coleoptera
- Suborder: Polyphaga
- Infraorder: Cucujiformia
- Family: Tenebrionidae
- Subfamily: Pimeliinae
- Tribe: Cossyphodini; Wasmann, 1899

Subtribes
- Cossyphodina Wasmann, 1899; Cossyphoditina Basilewsky, 1950; Esemephina Steiner, 1980; Paramellonina Andreae, 1961

Tribe of darkling beetles

Cossyphodini is a tribe of darkling beetles in the subfamily Pimeliinae of the family Tenebrionidae. There are about seven genera in Cossyphodini.

== Genera ==
These genera belong to the tribe Cossyphodini

- Cossyphodes Westwood, 1851 (the Palearctic and tropical Africa)
- Cossyphodinus Wasmann, 1899 (tropical Africa and Indomalaya)
- Cossyphodites Brauns, 1901 (tropical Africa)
- Esemephe Steiner, 1980 (the Neotropics)
- Mimocossyphus Pic, 1923 (the Palearctic)
- Paramellon C.O. Waterhouse, 1882 (the Palearctic, tropical Africa, and Indomalaya)
- Paramellops Andreae, 1961 (tropical Africa)
