= Leptodini =

Scientific classification
- Domain: Eukaryota
- Kingdom: Animalia
- Phylum: Arthropoda
- Class: Insecta
- Order: Coleoptera
- Suborder: Polyphaga
- Infraorder: Cucujiformia
- Family: Tenebrionidae
- Subfamily: Pimeliinae
- Tribe: Leptodini; Lacordaire, 1859

Tribe of beetles

Leptodini is a tribe of darkling beetles in the subfamily Pimeliinae of the family Tenebrionidae. There are at least two genera in Leptodini, found in the Palearctic.

== Genera ==
These genera belong to the tribe Leptodini

- Leptodes Dejean, 1834
- Tapenopsis Solier, 1843
