= Cephaloleia renei =

Scientific classification
- Kingdom: Animalia
- Phylum: Arthropoda
- Clade: Pancrustacea
- Class: Insecta
- Order: Coleoptera
- Suborder: Polyphaga
- Infraorder: Cucujiformia
- Family: Chrysomelidae
- Genus: Cephaloleia
- Species: C. renei

Binomial name
- Cephaloleia renei Sekerka, 2017

Species of beetle

Cephaloleia renei is a species of beetle of the family Chrysomelidae. It is found in Ecuador.

== Description ==
Adults reach a length of about 7.6–9.5 mm. They have a yellow body and the elytron has two black spots. Furthermore, the apical one-fifth of the elytron is yellow and the lateral margins are entirely yellow.

== Biology ==
The recorded food plant is Calathea variegata.

== Etymology ==
The species is named for René Fouquè, a friend of the author and an entomologist who was a specialist on the tenebrionid tribe Stenosini.
