= Phrynocarenum =

Scientific classification
- Domain: Eukaryota
- Kingdom: Animalia
- Phylum: Arthropoda
- Class: Insecta
- Order: Coleoptera
- Suborder: Polyphaga
- Infraorder: Cucujiformia
- Family: Tenebrionidae
- Subfamily: Pimeliinae
- Tribe: Phrynocarenini
- Genus: Phrynocarenum; Gebien, 1928

Genus of darkling beetles

Phrynocarenum is a genus of darkling beetles in the family Tenebrionidae, found in the Neotropics.

== Species ==
These species belong to the genus Phrynocarenum:

- Phrynocarenum strangulatum (Fairmaire, 1903)
- Phrynocarenum bruchianum Gebien, 1928
