= Trilobocarini =

Scientific classification
- Domain: Eukaryota
- Kingdom: Animalia
- Phylum: Arthropoda
- Class: Insecta
- Order: Coleoptera
- Suborder: Polyphaga
- Infraorder: Cucujiformia
- Family: Tenebrionidae
- Subfamily: Pimeliinae
- Tribe: Trilobocarini; Lacordaire, 1859

Tribe of beetles

Trilobocarini is a tribe of darkling beetles in the subfamily Pimeliinae of the family Tenebrionidae. There are about five genera in Trilobocarini, found mainly in the Neotropics.

== Genera ==
These genera belong to the tribe Trilobocarini

- Derosalax Gebien, 1926 (the Neotropics)
- Eremoecus Lacordaire, 1859 (the Neotropics)
- Peltolobus Lacordaire, 1859 (the Neotropics)
- Salax Guérin-Méneville, 1834 (the Neotropics and Australasia)
- Trilobocara Solier, 1851 (the Neotropics)
