= Falsomycterini =

Scientific classification
- Domain: Eukaryota
- Kingdom: Animalia
- Phylum: Arthropoda
- Class: Insecta
- Order: Coleoptera
- Suborder: Polyphaga
- Infraorder: Cucujiformia
- Family: Tenebrionidae
- Subfamily: Pimeliinae
- Tribe: Falsomycterini; Gebien, 1910

Tribe of beetles

Falsomycterini is a tribe of darkling beetles in the subfamily Pimeliinae of the family Tenebrionidae. There are at least two genera in Falsomycterini, found in the Neotropics.

== Genera ==
These genera belong to the tribe Falsomycterini

- Falsomycterus Pic, 1907
- Pteroctenus Kirsch, 1866
