= Cryptochile elegans =

Scientific classification
- Kingdom: Animalia
- Phylum: Arthropoda
- Class: Insecta
- Order: Coleoptera
- Suborder: Polyphaga
- Infraorder: Cucujiformia
- Family: Tenebrionidae
- Genus: Cryptochile
- Species: C. elegans

Binomial name
- Cryptochile elegans (Gerstaecker, 1854)

Species of beetle

Cryptochile elegans is a species of darkling beetles in the subfamily Pimeliinae. It is found in Kenya.
