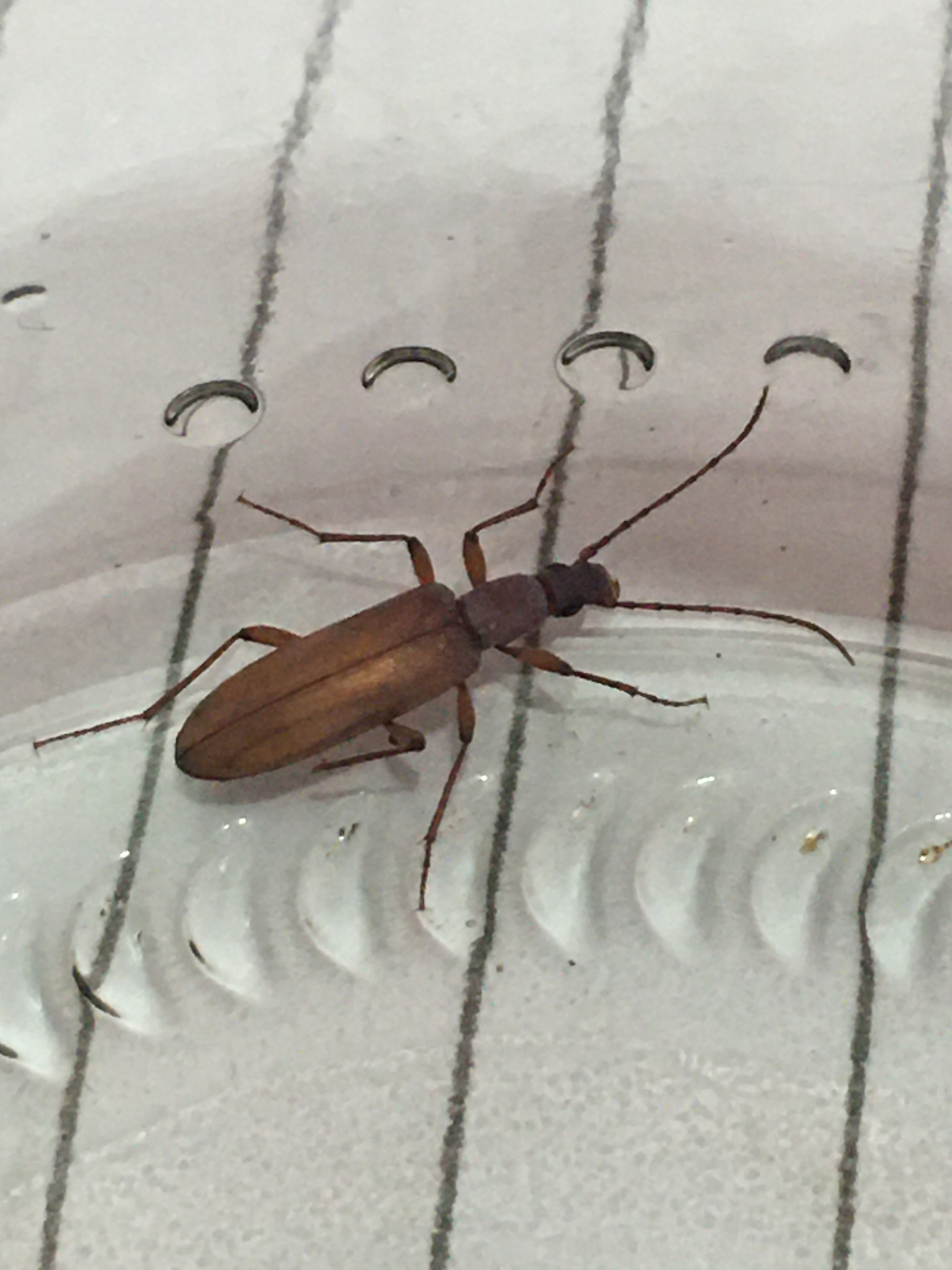
- Aryenis, Bolivia

Scientific classification
- Domain: Eukaryota
- Kingdom: Animalia
- Phylum: Arthropoda
- Class: Insecta
- Order: Coleoptera
- Suborder: Polyphaga
- Infraorder: Cucujiformia
- Family: Tenebrionidae
- Subfamily: Pimeliinae
- Tribe: Evaniosomini; Lacordaire, 1859

= Evaniosomini =

Tribe of beetles

Evaniosomini is a tribe of darkling beetles in the subfamily Pimeliinae of the family Tenebrionidae. There are about eight genera in Evaniosomini, found primarily in the Neotropics.

== Genera ==
These genera belong to the tribe Evaniosomini:

- Achanius Erichson, 1847 (the Neotropics)
- Aryenis Bates, 1868 (the Neotropics)
- Chorasmius Bates, 1868 (the Neotropics)
- Evaniosomus Guérin-Méneville, 1834 (the Neotropics)
- Evelina J. Thomson, 1860 (the Neotropics)
- Melaphorus Guérin-Méneville, 1834 (the Neotropics)
- Oppenheimeria Koch, 1952 (tropical Africa)
- Vaniosus Kulzer, 1956 (the Neotropics)
