= Klewaria =

Scientific classification
- Kingdom: Animalia
- Phylum: Arthropoda
- Clade: Pancrustacea
- Class: Insecta
- Order: Coleoptera
- Suborder: Polyphaga
- Infraorder: Cucujiformia
- Family: Tenebrionidae
- Subfamily: Pimeliinae
- Tribe: Klewariini
- Genus: Klewaria; Reitter, 1910

Genus of darkling beetles

Klewaria is a genus of darkling beetles in the family Tenebrionidae, found in the Palearctic.
