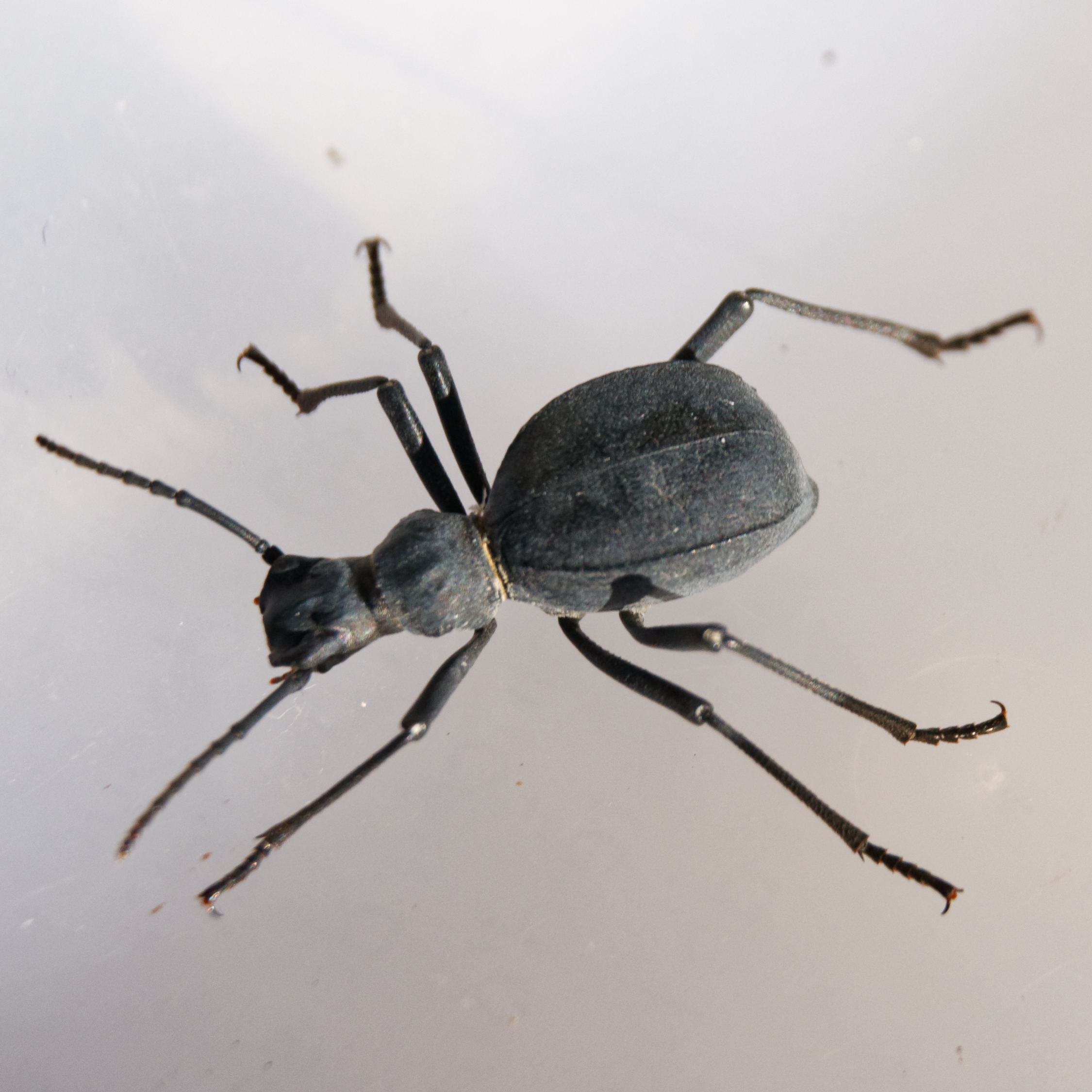
- Leptoderis collaris, France

Scientific classification
- Domain: Eukaryota
- Kingdom: Animalia
- Phylum: Arthropoda
- Class: Insecta
- Order: Coleoptera
- Suborder: Polyphaga
- Infraorder: Cucujiformia
- Family: Tenebrionidae
- Subfamily: Pimeliinae
- Tribe: Elenophorini; Solier, 1837

Subtribes
- Elenophorina Solier, 1837; Megelenophorina Ferrer, 2015

= Elenophorini =

Tribe of beetles

Elenophorini is a tribe of darkling beetles in the subfamily Pimeliinae of the family Tenebrionidae. There are at least three genera in Elenophorini.

== Genera ==
These genera belong to the tribe Elenophorini

- Leptoderis Billberg, 1820 (the Palearctic)
- Megelenophorus Gebien, 1910 (the Neotropics)
- Psammetichus Latreille, 1828 (the Neotropics)
