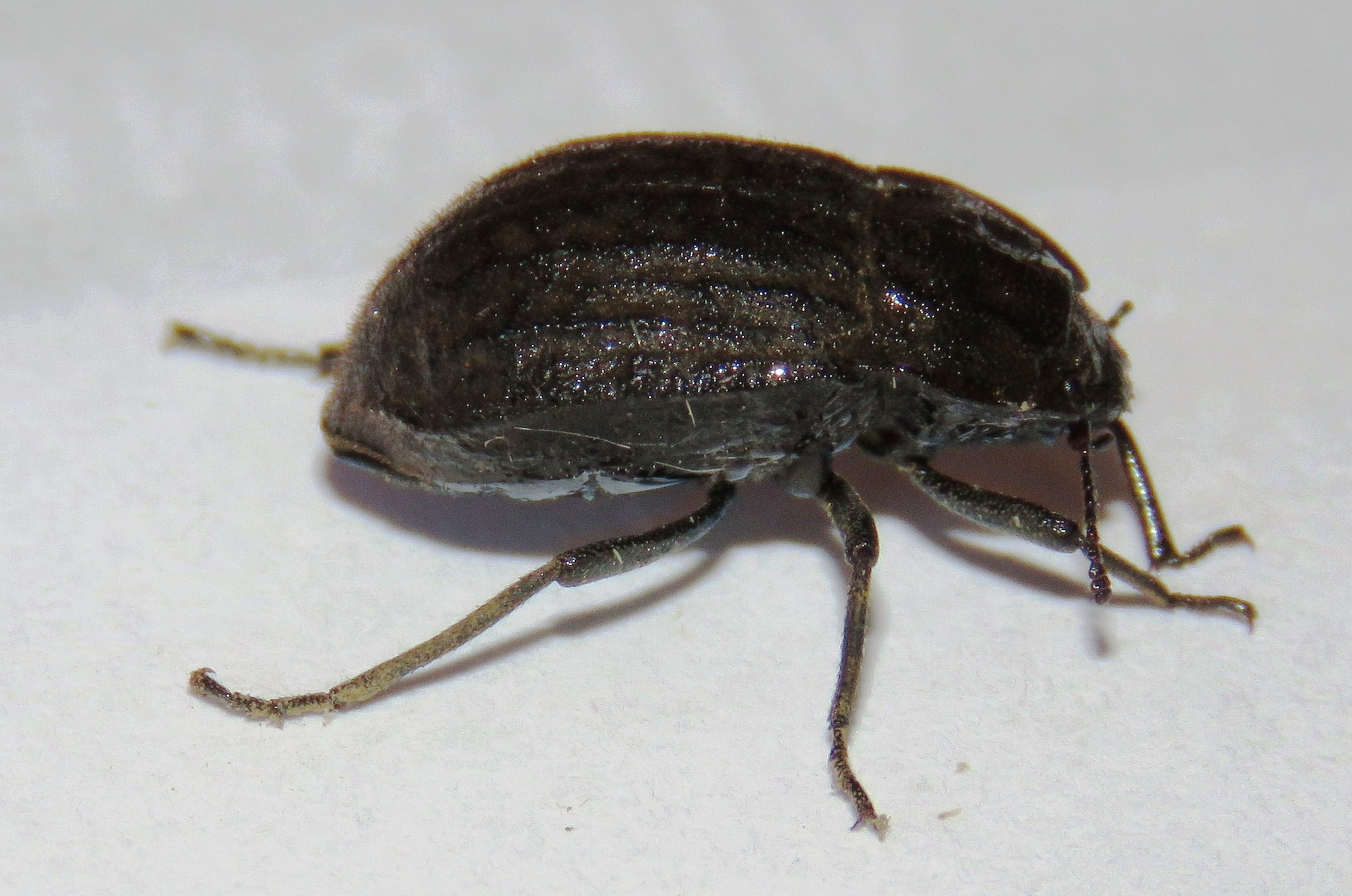
- Branchus obscurus, Nicaragua

Scientific classification
- Kingdom: Animalia
- Phylum: Arthropoda
- Class: Insecta
- Order: Coleoptera
- Suborder: Polyphaga
- Infraorder: Cucujiformia
- Family: Tenebrionidae
- Subfamily: Pimeliinae
- Tribe: Branchini; LeConte, 1862

= Branchini =

Tribe of darkling beetles

Branchini is a tribe of darkling beetles in the subfamily Pimeliinae of the family Tenebrionidae. There are at least three genera in Branchini.

== Genera ==
These genera belong to the tribe Branchini

- Anectus Horn, 1867 (the Neotropics)
- Branchus Leconte, 1862 (North America and the Neotropics)
- Oxinthas Champion, 1884 (the Neotropics)
