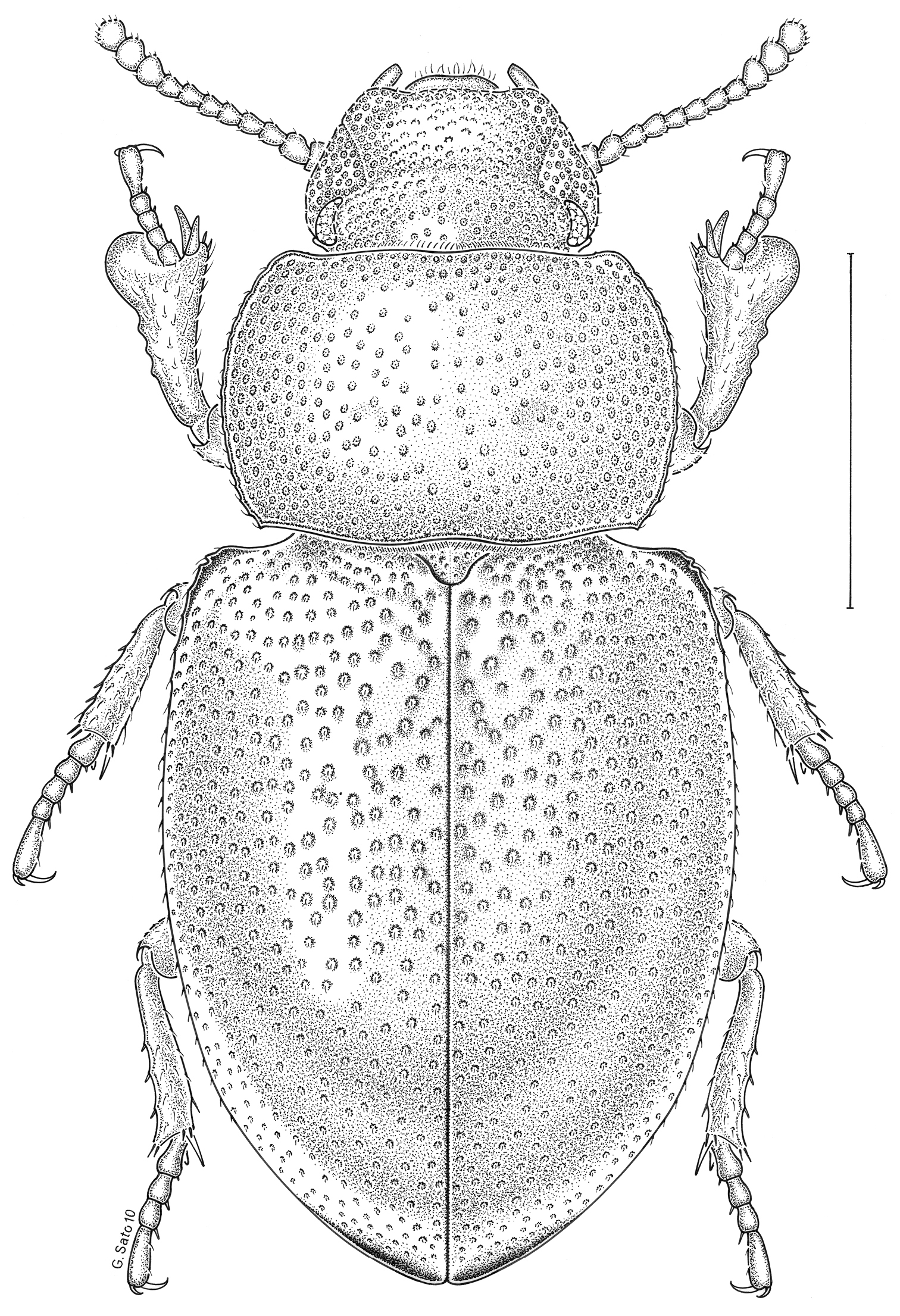
- Anepsius montanus

Scientific classification
- Domain: Eukaryota
- Kingdom: Animalia
- Phylum: Arthropoda
- Class: Insecta
- Order: Coleoptera
- Suborder: Polyphaga
- Infraorder: Cucujiformia
- Family: Tenebrionidae
- Subfamily: Pimeliinae
- Tribe: Anepsiini; LeConte, 1862

= Anepsiini =

Tribe of beetles

Anepsiini is a tribe of darkling beetles in the subfamily Pimeliinae of the family Tenebrionidae. There are at least four genera in Anepsiini, found in North America.

== Genera ==
These genera belong to the tribe Anepsiini:

- Anepsius LeConte, 1851
- Batuliodes Casey, 1907
- Batuliomorpha Doyen, 1987
- Batulius Leconte, 1851
