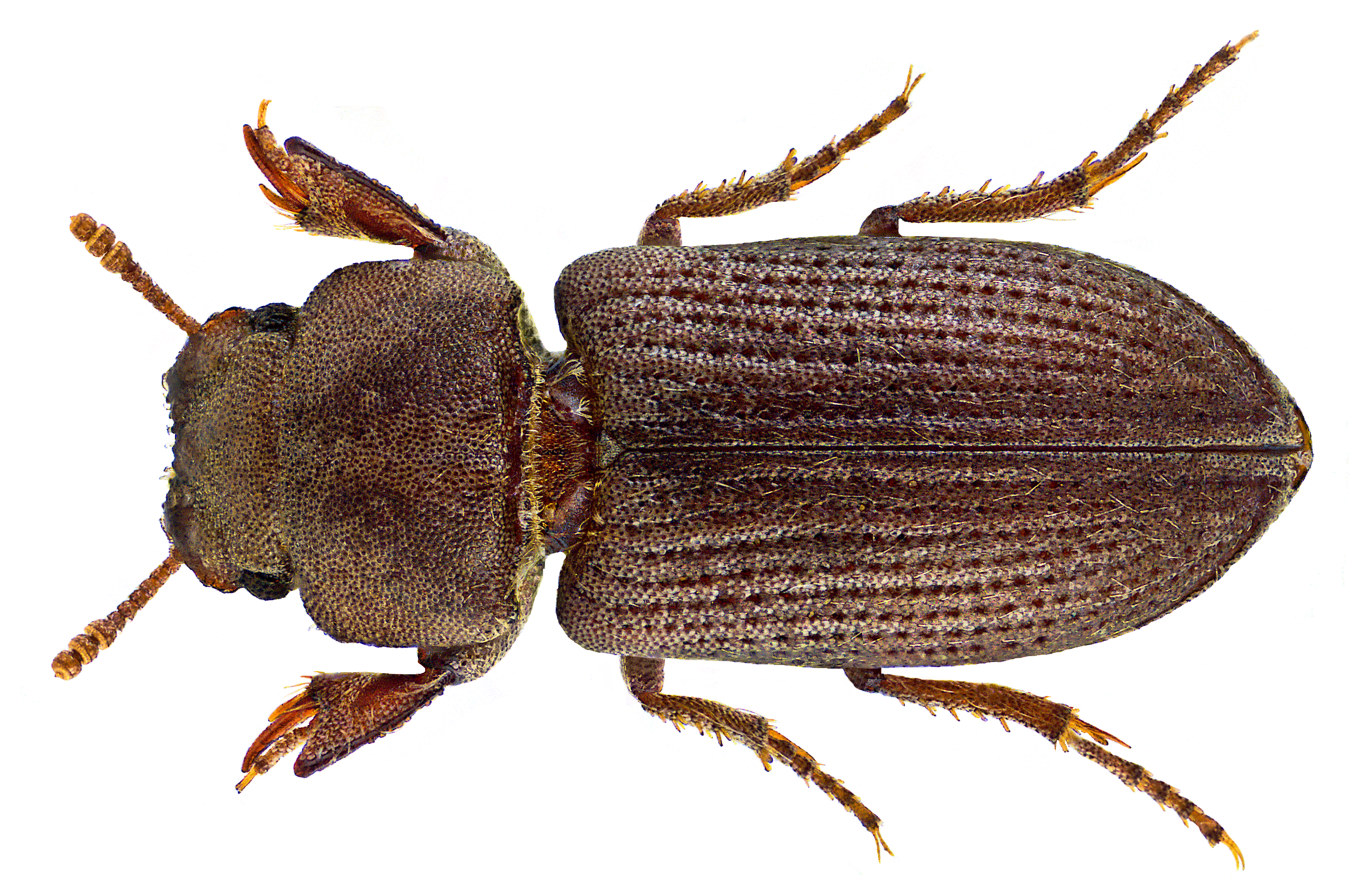
- Philhammus ferenczi, Gambia

Scientific classification
- Kingdom: Animalia
- Phylum: Arthropoda
- Class: Insecta
- Order: Coleoptera
- Suborder: Polyphaga
- Infraorder: Cucujiformia
- Family: Tenebrionidae
- Subfamily: Pimeliinae
- Tribe: Cnemeplatiini; Jacquelin du Val, 1861

Subtribes
- Actizetina Watt, 1992; Alaudina Aalbu, Caterino & Smith, 2018; Cnemeplatiina Jacquelin du Val, 1861; Rondoniellina Ferrer & Moragues, 2000; Thorictosomatina Watt, 1992

= Cnemeplatiini =

Tribe of darkling beetles

Cnemeplatiini is a tribe of darkling beetles in the subfamily Pimeliinae of the family Tenebrionidae. There are about nine genera in Cnemeplatiini.

== Genera ==
These genera belong to the tribe Cnemeplatiini

- Actizeta Pascoe, 1875 (New Zealand)
- Alaudes Horn, 1870 (North America)
- Cnemeplatia Costa, 1847 (the Palearctic, tropical Africa, and Indomalaya)
- Durandius Kaszab, 1970 (Indomalaya)
- Lepidocnemeplatia Bousquet & Bouchard, 2018 (North America, the Neotropics, and Indomalaya)
- Philhammus Fairmaire, 1871 (the Palearctic and tropical Africa)
- Rondoniella Kaszab, 1970 (Indomalaya)
- Thorictosoma Lea, 1919 (Australasia)
- Wattiana Matthews & Lawrence, 2005 (Australasia)
