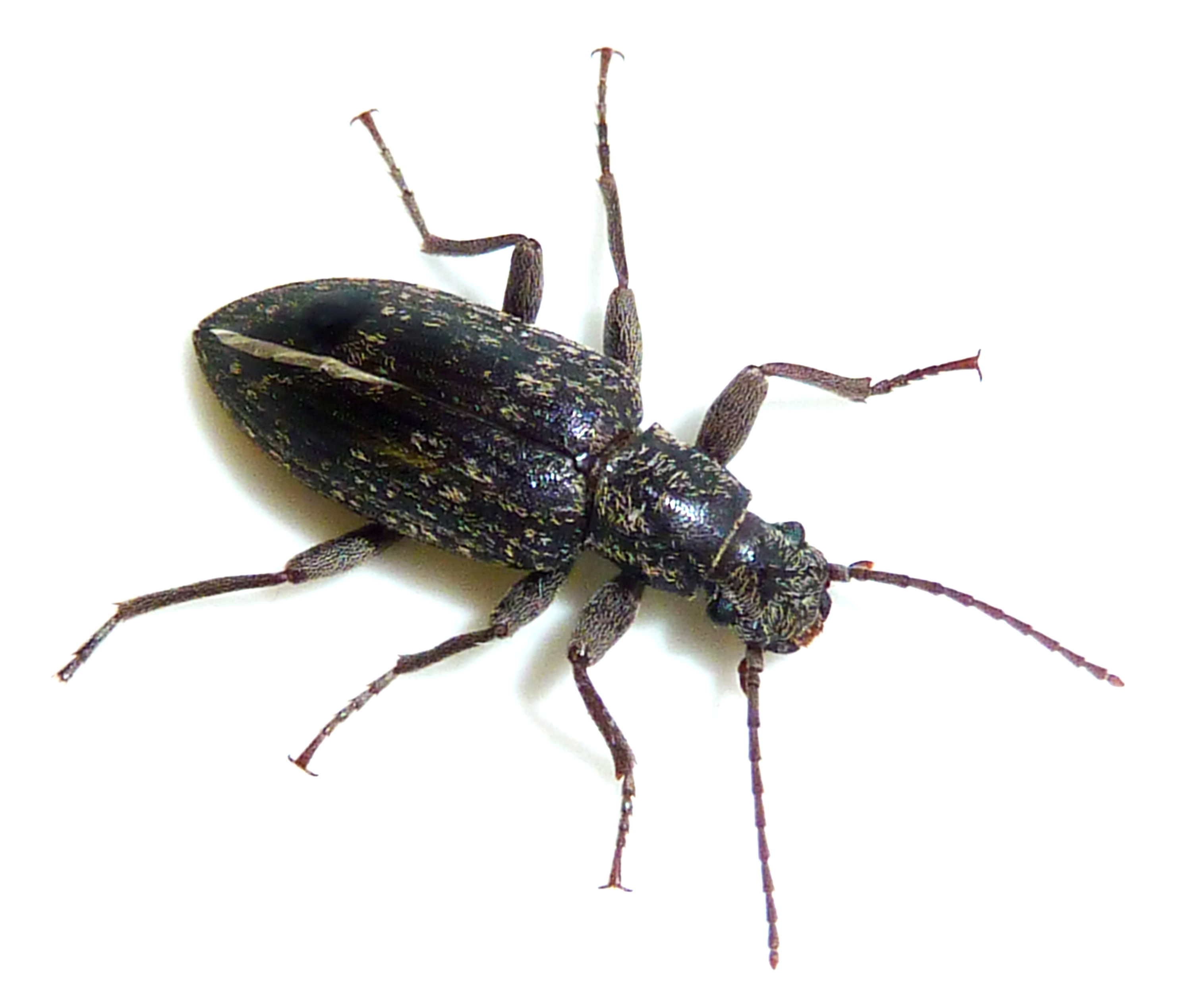

Scientific classification
- Kingdom: Animalia
- Phylum: Arthropoda
- Class: Insecta
- Order: Coleoptera
- Suborder: Polyphaga
- Infraorder: Cucujiformia
- Family: Tenebrionidae
- Tribe: Epitragini
- Genus: Hymatismus; Erichson, 1843

= Hymatismus =

Genus of beetles

Hymatismus, the tapering darkling beetles, are an Afrotropical genus of darkling beetles (Tenebrionidae). They are elongate or oval-shaped, with pointed abdomens and protruding eyes. The elytra show longitudinal bands, and like the head and pronotum, are covered with unevenly distributed yellow hairs. They are lethargic scavengers occupying a catholic range of habitats.

== Species ==
There are at least three species:

- Himatismus buprestoides Gerstaecker, 1862
- Himatismus fasciculatus (Fabricius, 1798)
- Hymatismus villosus Haag-Rutenberg, 1870
