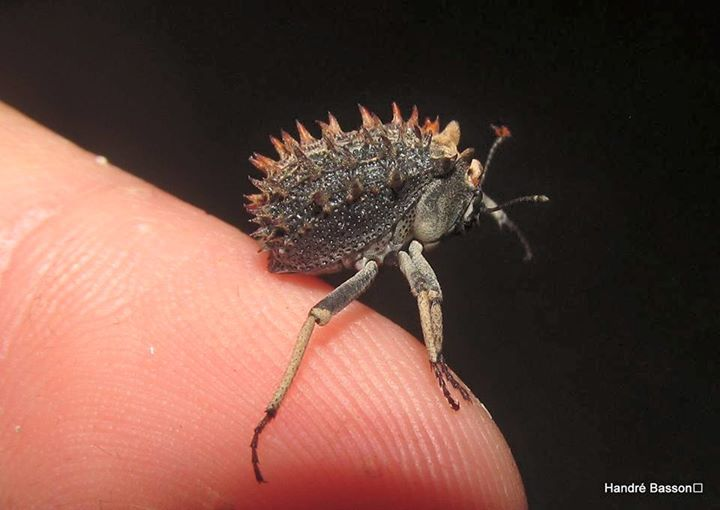
- Cryptochile echinata, South Africa

Scientific classification
- Domain: Eukaryota
- Kingdom: Animalia
- Phylum: Arthropoda
- Class: Insecta
- Order: Coleoptera
- Suborder: Polyphaga
- Infraorder: Cucujiformia
- Family: Tenebrionidae
- Subfamily: Pimeliinae
- Tribe: Cryptochilini; Solier, 1841

Subtribes
- Calognathina Lacordaire, 1859; Cryptochilina Solier, 1841; Homebiina Endrödy-Younga, 1989; Vansoniina Koch, 1955

= Cryptochilini =

Tribe of beetles

Cryptochilini is a tribe of darkling beetles in the subfamily Pimeliinae of the family Tenebrionidae. There are about 11 genera in Cryptochilini, found in tropical Africa.

== Genera ==
These genera belong to the tribe Cryptochilini

- Calognathus Guérin-Méneville, 1836
- Cerasoma Endrödy-Younga, 1989
- Cryptochile Latreille, 1828
- Cychrochile Koch, 1953
- Epipagus Haag-Rutenberg, 1872
- Homebius Endrödy-Younga, 1989
- Horatoma Solier, 1841
- Horatomella Penrith & Endrödy-Younga, 1994
- Orientochile Penrith & Endrödy-Younga, 1994
- Pachynotelus Solier, 1841
- Vansonium Koch, 1950
