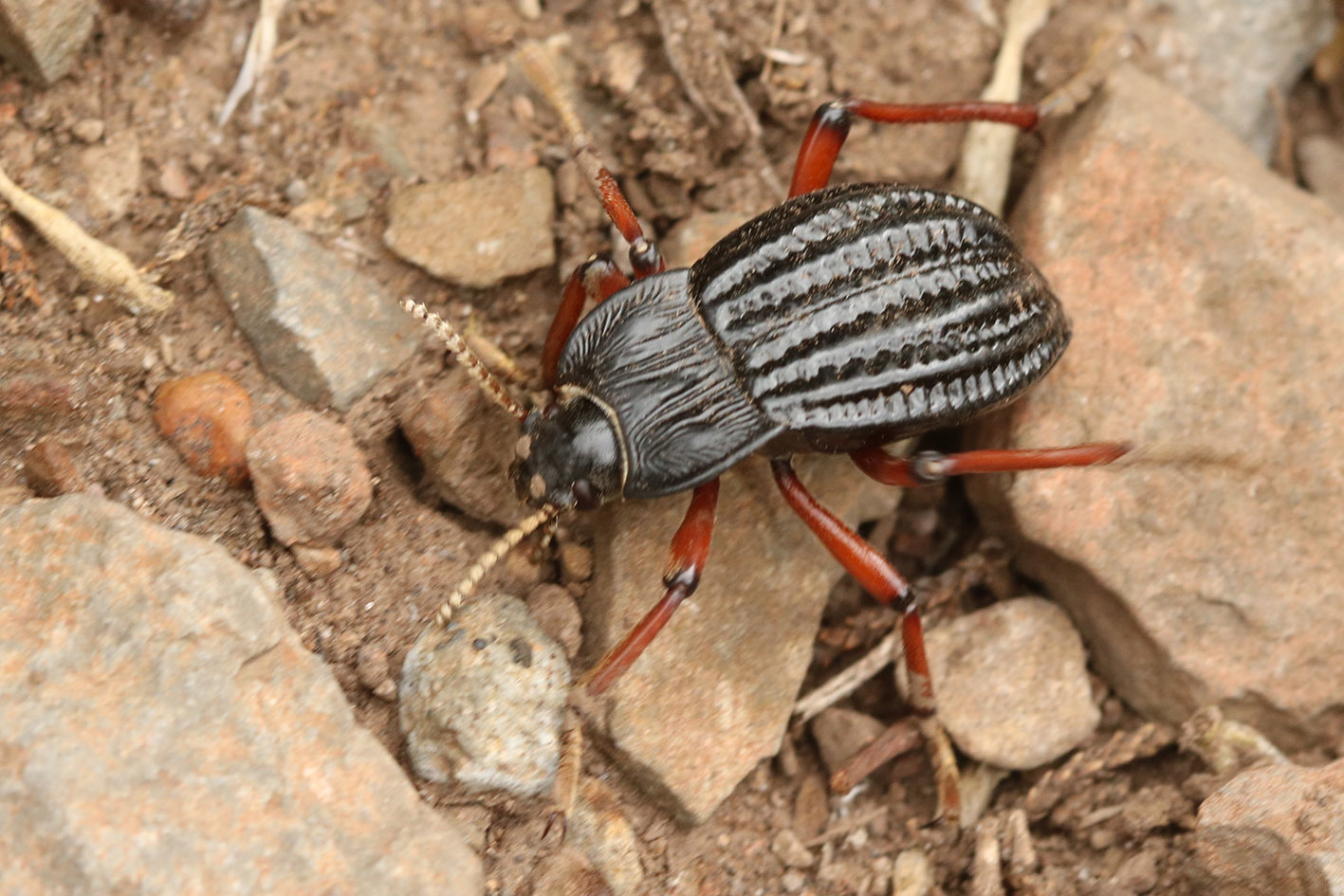
- Epipedonota nitida, Argentina

Scientific classification
- Domain: Eukaryota
- Kingdom: Animalia
- Phylum: Arthropoda
- Class: Insecta
- Order: Coleoptera
- Suborder: Polyphaga
- Infraorder: Cucujiformia
- Family: Tenebrionidae
- Subfamily: Pimeliinae
- Tribe: Nycteliini; Solier, 1834

= Nycteliini =

Tribe of beetles

Nycteliini is a tribe of darkling beetles in the subfamily Pimeliinae of the family Tenebrionidae. There are about 12 genera in Nycteliini, found in the Neotropics.

== Genera ==
These genera belong to the tribe Nycteliini

- Auladera Solier, 1836
- Callyntra Solier, 1836
- Entomobalia Flores & Triplehorn, 2002
- Entomoderes Solier, 1836
- Epipedonota Solier, 1836
- Gyriosomus Guérin-Méneville, 1834
- Mitragenius Solier, 1836
- Nyctelia Berthold, 1827
- Patagonogenius Flores, 1999
- Pilobalia Burmeister, 1875
- Psectrascelis Solier, 1836
- Scelidospecta Kulzer, 1954
