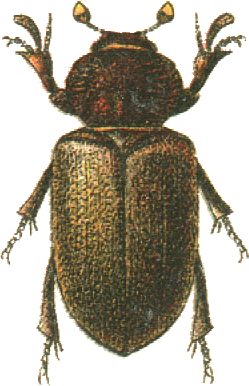

Scientific classification
- Kingdom: Animalia
- Phylum: Arthropoda
- Clade: Pancrustacea
- Class: Insecta
- Order: Coleoptera
- Suborder: Polyphaga
- Infraorder: Cucujiformia
- Family: Tenebrionidae
- Subfamily: Pimeliinae
- Tribe: Lachnogyini; Seidlitz, 1894

Subtribes
- Lachnodactylina Reitter, 1904; Lachnogyina Seidlitz, 1894; Netuschiliina Ferrer & Yvinec, 2004

= Lachnogyini =

Tribe of beetles

Lachnogyini is a tribe of darkling beetles in the subfamily Pimeliinae of the family Tenebrionidae. There are at least three genera in Lachnogyini.

== Genera ==
These genera belong to the tribe Lachnogyini

- Lachnodactylus Seidlitz, 1898 (the Palearctic)
- Lachnogya Ménétriés, 1849 (the Palearctic and Indomalaya)
- Netuschilia Reitter, 1904 (the Palearctic)
