= Boromorphus =

Scientific classification
- Domain: Eukaryota
- Kingdom: Animalia
- Phylum: Arthropoda
- Class: Insecta
- Order: Coleoptera
- Suborder: Polyphaga
- Infraorder: Cucujiformia
- Family: Tenebrionidae
- Subfamily: Pimeliinae
- Tribe: Boromorphini
- Genus: Boromorphus; Wollaston, 1854

Genus of beetles

Boromorphus is a genus of darkling beetles in the family Tenebrionidae. There are at least four described species in Boromorphus, found in the Palearctic. It is the sole genus in its tribe, Boromorphini.

== Species ==
These species belong to the genus Boromorphus:

- Boromorphus italicus Gardini, 2010
- Boromorphus saudicus Schawaller, 2013
- Boromorphus parvus Wollaston, 1865
- Boromorphus tagenioides (Lucas, 1849)
