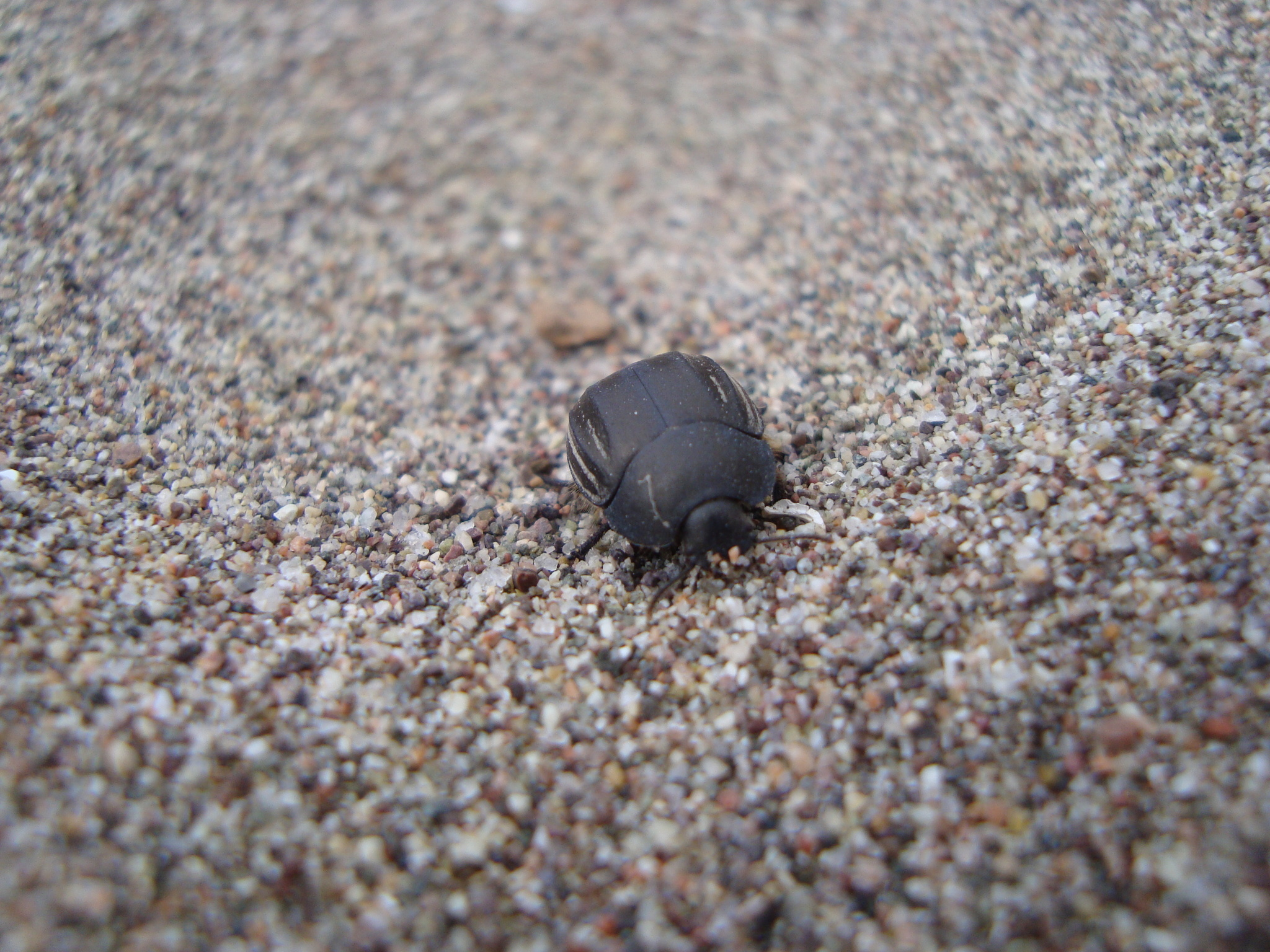
- Praocis spinolai

Scientific classification
- Domain: Eukaryota
- Kingdom: Animalia
- Phylum: Arthropoda
- Class: Insecta
- Order: Coleoptera
- Suborder: Polyphaga
- Infraorder: Cucujiformia
- Family: Tenebrionidae
- Subfamily: Pimeliinae
- Tribe: Praociini
- Genus: Praocis; Eschscholtz

Species
- See text

= Praocis =

Genus of insects

Praocis is a genus of Neotropical beetles in the tribe Praociini. It is distributed from Peru to southern Patagonia in Argentina and Chile.

== Taxonomy ==
Praocis contains the following species:

- Praocis pilula
- Praocis costipennis
- Praocis tenuicornis
- Praocis adspersa
- Praocis calderana
- Praocis quadrisulcata
- Praocis orthogonoderes
- Praocis cribata
- Praocis oblonga
- Praocis forsteri
- Praocis uretai
- Praocis nitens
- Praocis rufipes
- Praocis sellata
- Praocis chevrolati
- Praocis marginata
- Praocis elliptica
- Praocis spinolai
