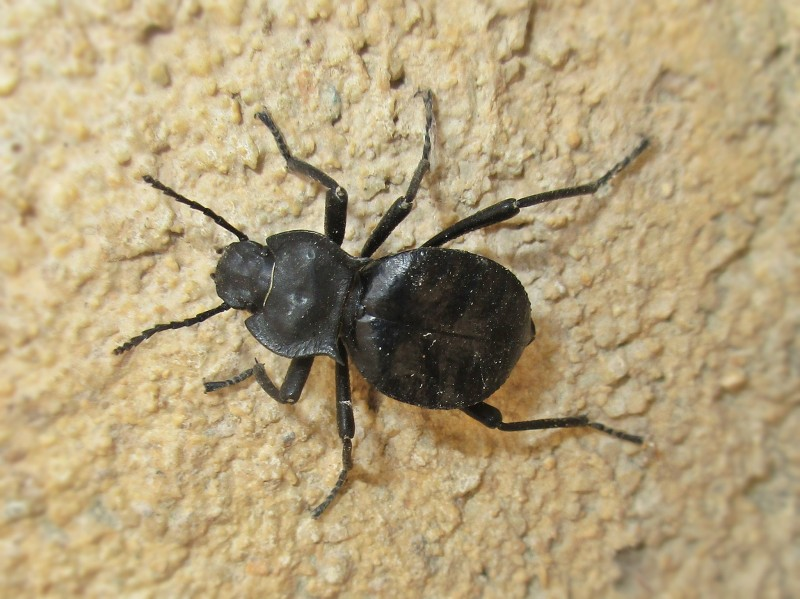
- Akis sp., Italy

Scientific classification
- Kingdom: Animalia
- Phylum: Arthropoda
- Clade: Pancrustacea
- Class: Insecta
- Order: Coleoptera
- Suborder: Polyphaga
- Infraorder: Cucujiformia
- Family: Tenebrionidae
- Subfamily: Pimeliinae
- Tribe: Akidini; Billberg, 1820

= Akidini =

Tribe of beetles

Akidini is a tribe of darkling beetles in the subfamily Pimeliinae in the family Tenebrionidae. There are about 5 genera in the tribe Akidini, species of which are found in the Palearctic.

== Genera ==
These genera belong to the tribe Akidini:

- Akis Herbst, 1799
- Cyphogenia Solier, 1837
- Morica Dejean, 1834
- Sarothropus Kraatz, 1865
- Solskyia Solsky, 1881
