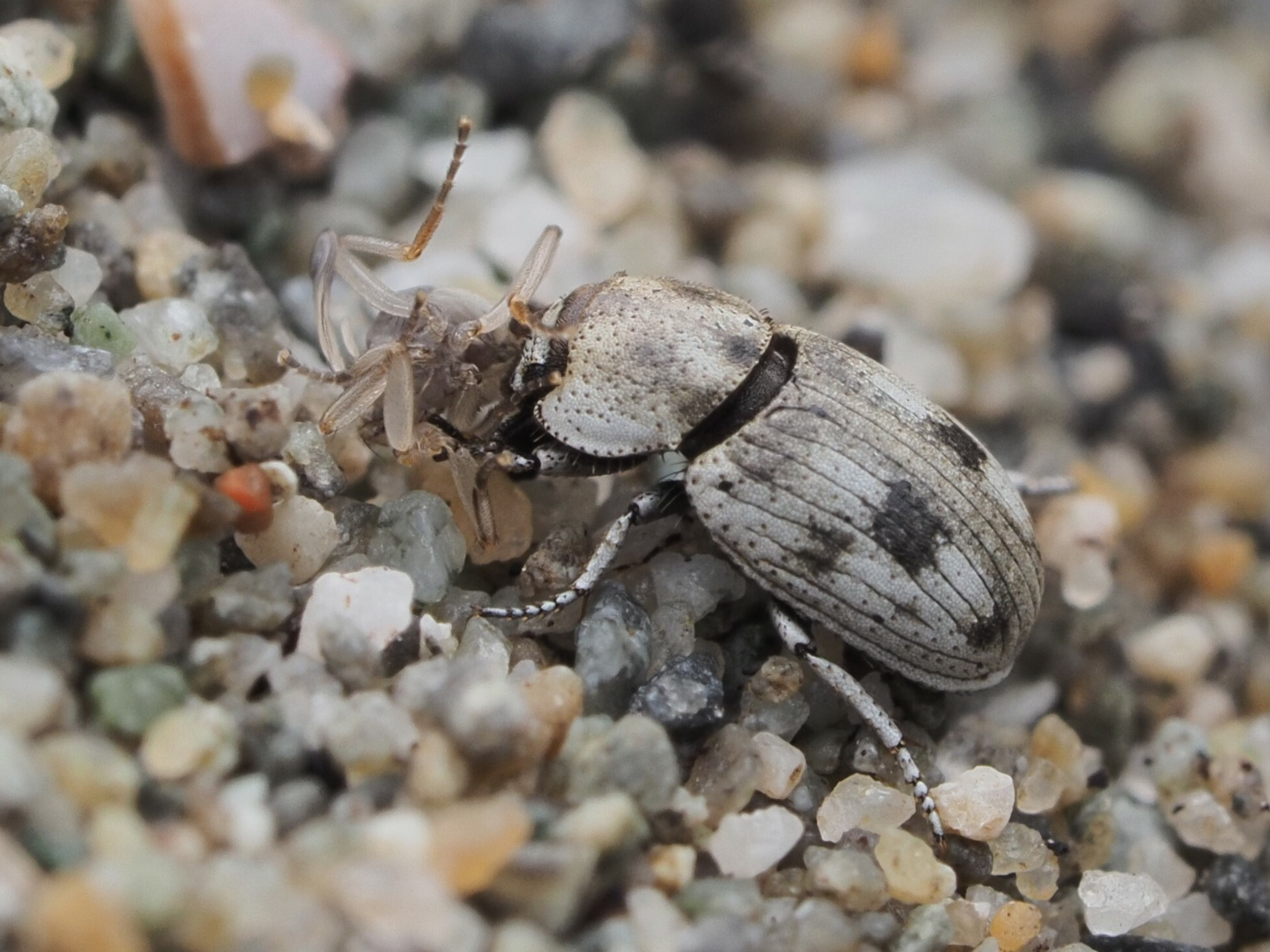

Scientific classification
- Kingdom: Animalia
- Phylum: Arthropoda
- Class: Insecta
- Order: Coleoptera
- Suborder: Polyphaga
- Infraorder: Cucujiformia
- Family: Tenebrionidae
- Genus: Actizeta
- Species: A. albata

Binomial name
- Actizeta albata Pascoe, 1875

Synonyms
- Actizeta ammobioides Pascoe 1875

= Actizeta albata =

Species of beetle

Actizeta albata are a species of darkling beetle endemic to New Zealand. They were first described in 1875 by Francis Pascoe and were the first species of the Actizeta genus to be described. A. albata live along the coast in sandy beaches. They are a diurnal species that act as scavengers.

== Taxonomy ==
This species was described in 1875 by Francis Polkinghorne Pascoe from specimens collected in Waikato. It is the type species of Actizeta. Another species was described in the same publication, Actizeta ammobioides, but was later recognised to be the same species. The lectotype is stored in the Natural History Museum of London.

== Description ==
As adults, Actizeta albata are 2.6-3.4mm in length. A. albata can be distinguished from the only other species in the genus, Actizeta fusca, by the shape of the anterior tibia and eyes, and the colour of the scales, body, and antennae. On the outer edge of the front tibia there is a deep depression. The eyes are fairly large and round. The body is dark brown and is covered in scales that are mostly whitish, but may be dark. These light and dark scales form markings on the body. The antennae is dark brown.

The larvae are whitish and have an elongated appearance. The mandibles and claws are dark brown.

== Distribution and habitat ==
These beetles are endemic to New Zealand, where they live on sandy beaches. They are widespread throughout the North Island and the northern half of the South Island. They occur in sandy zones above the high tide mark, sand dunes and dune blow-outs.

== Diet ==
As adults, Actizeta albata are scavengers that are sometimes seen feeding on dead invertebrates and other carrion.

== Behaviour ==
A. albata are reported to be diurnal. Usually the adults are hiding below the surface but will come out and scavenge when the sands temperature begins to exceed 26°C.
