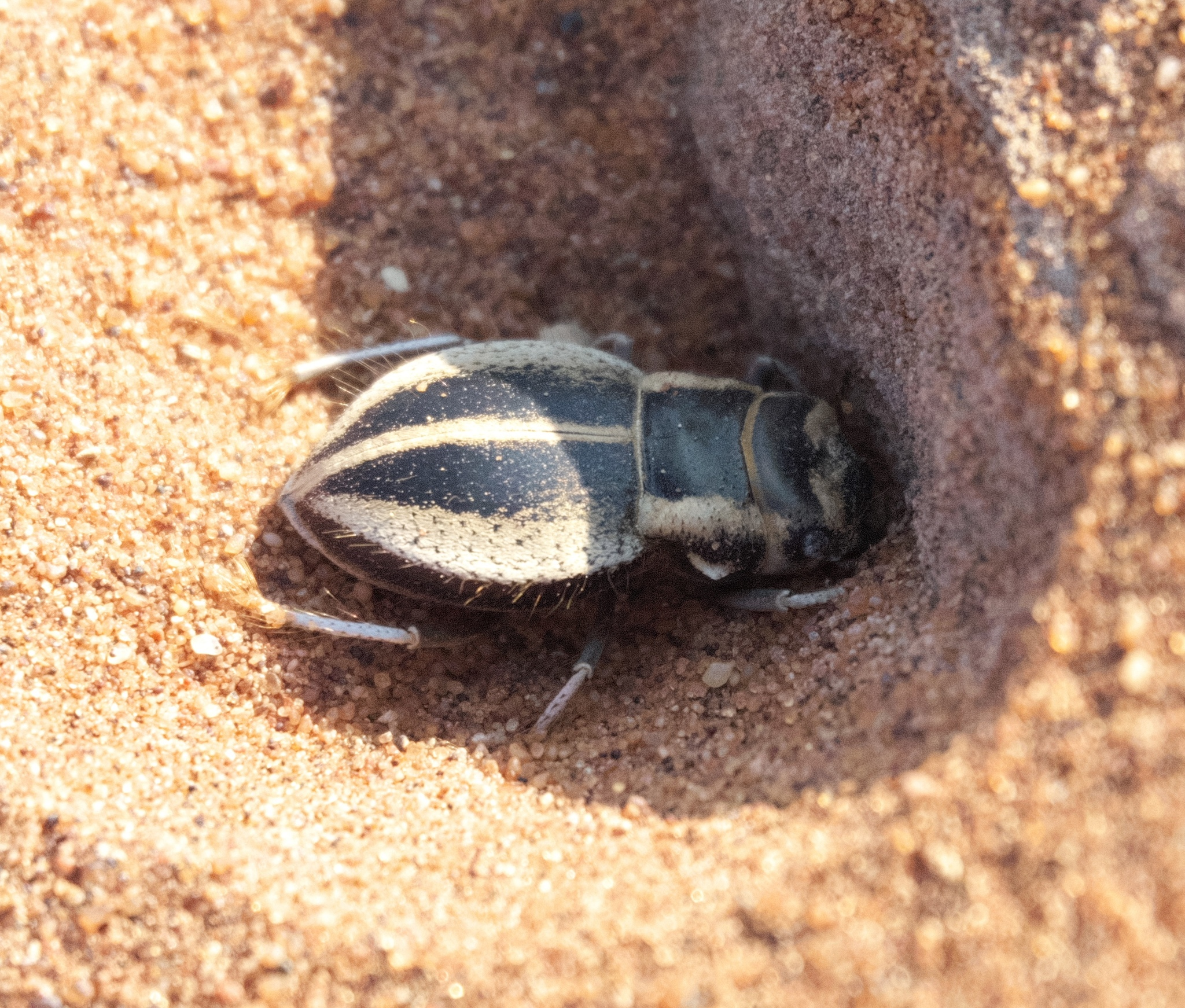
- Calognathus chevrolati, Namibia

Scientific classification
- Kingdom: Animalia
- Phylum: Arthropoda
- Clade: Pancrustacea
- Class: Insecta
- Order: Coleoptera
- Suborder: Polyphaga
- Infraorder: Cucujiformia
- Family: Tenebrionidae
- Subfamily: Pimeliinae
- Tribe: Cryptochilini
- Subtribe: Calognathina
- Genus: Calognathus; Guérin-Méneville, 1836
- Species: C. chevrolati

Binomial name
- Calognathus chevrolati Guérin-Méneville, 1836

Synonyms
- Ancylognathus Dejean, 1836; Callignathus Agassiz, 1846

= Calognathus =

Genus of beetles

Calognathus is a genus of darkling beetles in the family Tenebrionidae. This genus has a single species, Calognathus chevrolati, sometimes called stag darkling. It is found in the Namib Desert of southwest Africa.
