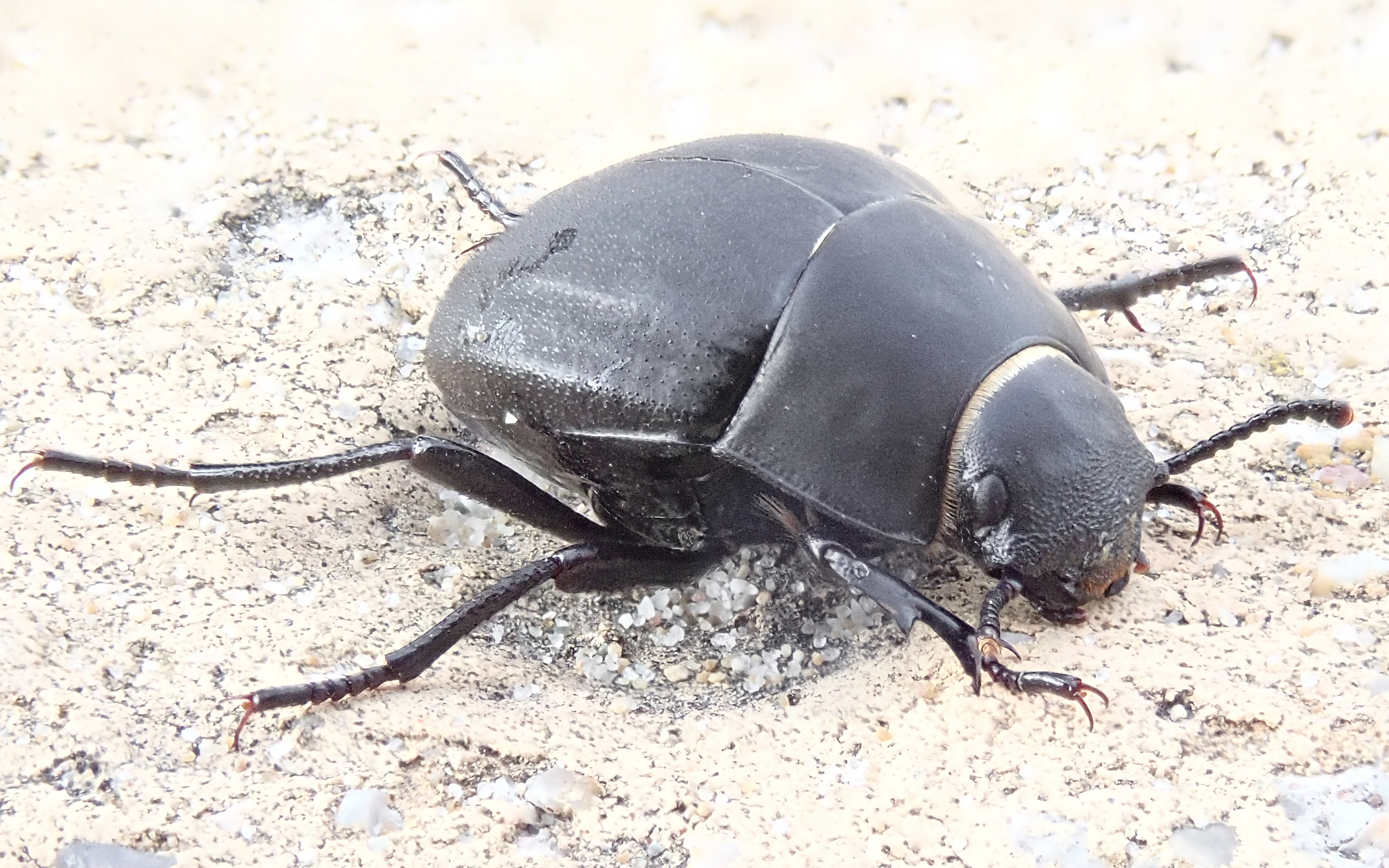
- Erodius siculus dalmatinus, Italy

Scientific classification
- Domain: Eukaryota
- Kingdom: Animalia
- Phylum: Arthropoda
- Class: Insecta
- Order: Coleoptera
- Suborder: Polyphaga
- Infraorder: Cucujiformia
- Family: Tenebrionidae
- Subfamily: Pimeliinae
- Tribe: Erodiini; Billberg, 1820

= Erodiini =

Tribe of beetles

Erodiini is a tribe of darkling beetles in the subfamily Pimeliinae of the family Tenebrionidae. There are more than 30 genera in Erodiini.

== Genera ==
These genera belong to the tribe Erodiini

- Ammodoides Lesne, 1915 (tropical Africa)
- Ammozoides Kaszab, 1979 (the Palearctic)
- Ammozoum Semenov, 1891 (the Palearctic)
- Amnodeis Miller, 1858 (the Palearctic)
- Anodesis Solier, 1834 (tropical Africa)
- Apentanodes Reitter, 1914 (the Palearctic and Indomalaya)
- Arthrodeis Solier, 1834 (the Palearctic and tropical Africa)
- Arthrodibius Lesne, 1915 (the Palearctic and tropical Africa)
- Arthrodion Lesne, 1915 (tropical Africa)
- Arthrodosis Reitter, 1900 (the Palearctic)
- Arthrodygmus Reitter, 1914 (Indomalaya)
- Arthrohyalosis Kaszab, 1979 (the Palearctic)
- Arthrohyalus Koch, 1943 (the Palearctic)
- Bulbulus Lesne, 1915 (the Palearctic)
- Capricephalius Koch, 1943 (the Palearctic)
- Diaphanidus Reitter, 1900 (the Palearctic)
- Diodontes Solier, 1834 (tropical Africa)
- Erodinus Reitter, 1900
- Erodiontes Reitter, 1914 (the Palearctic)
- Erodius Fabricius, 1775 (the Palearctic)
- Farsarthrosis Kaszab, 1979 (the Palearctic)
- Foleya Peyerimhoff, 1916 (the Palearctic)
- Histeromimus Gahan, 1895 (the Palearctic)
- Histeromorphus Kraatz, 1865 (tropical Africa)
- Hyalarthrodosis Kaszab, 1979 (the Palearctic)
- Hyalerodius Kaszab, 1979 (the Palearctic)
- Iranerodius Kaszab, 1959 (the Palearctic)
- Leptonychoides Schawaller, 1990 (the Palearctic)
- Leptonychus Chevrolat, 1833 (the Palearctic)
- Piestognathoides Kaszab, 1981 (the Palearctic)
- Piestognathus P.H. Lucas, 1858 (the Palearctic)
- Somalammodes Koch, 1943 (tropical Africa)
- Spyrathus Kraatz, 1865 (the Palearctic and Indomalaya)
