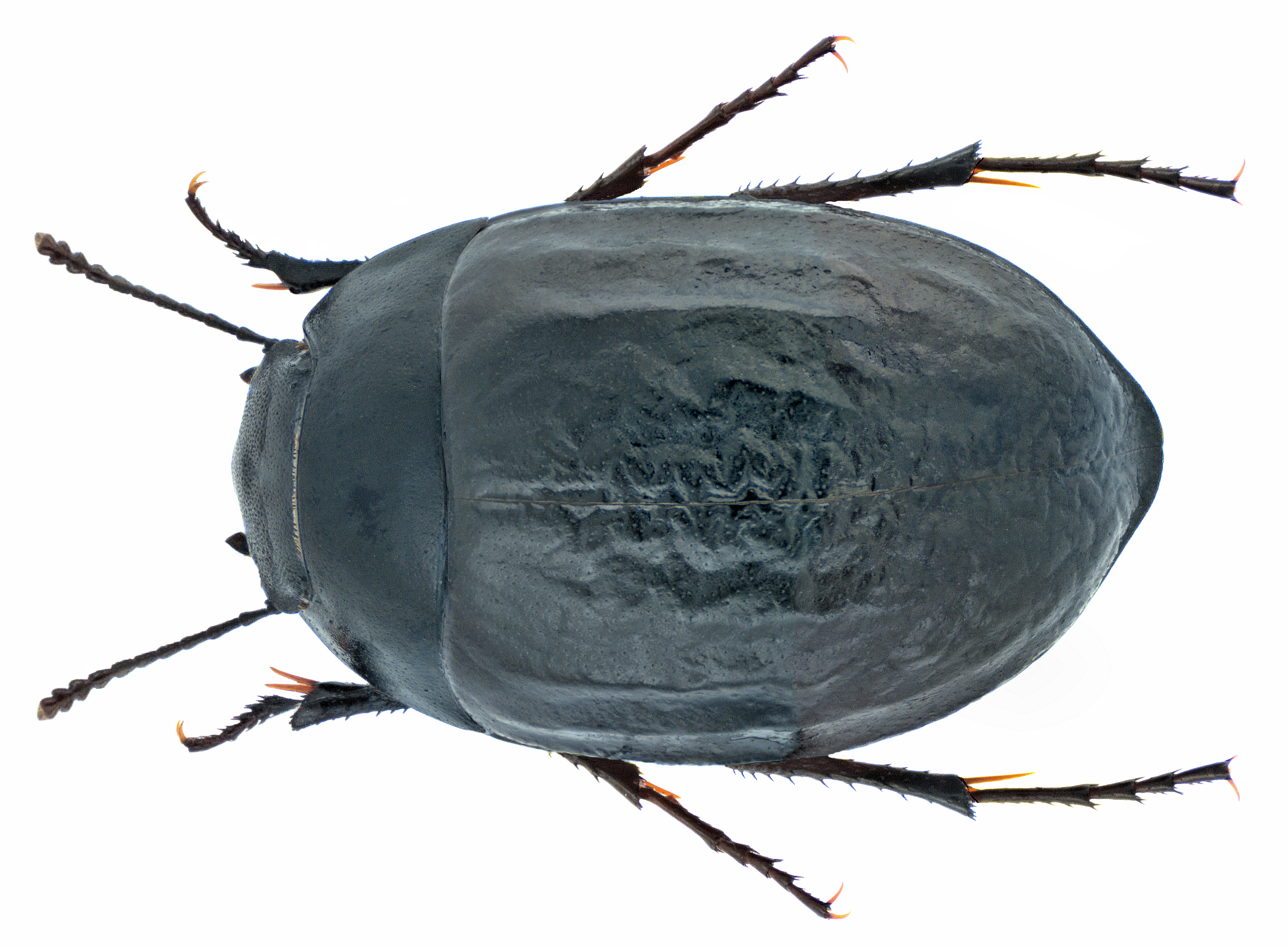
- Zophosis bicarinata

Scientific classification
- Kingdom: Animalia
- Phylum: Arthropoda
- Class: Insecta
- Order: Coleoptera
- Suborder: Polyphaga
- Infraorder: Cucujiformia
- Family: Tenebrionidae
- Subfamily: Pimeliinae
- Tribe: Zophosini
- Genus: Zophosis; Latreille, 1802

Subgenera
- Anacardiosis Endrödy-Younga, 1986; Anisosis Deyrolle, 1867; Calosis Deyrolle, 1867; Cardiosis Deyrolle, 1867; Caroliphosis Penrith, 1981; Carpiella Koch, 1962; Cerosis Gebien, 1920; Cheirosis Deyrolle, 1867; Dactylocalcar Gebien, 1938; Dignathosis Koch, 1958; Gahanosis Penrith, 1983; Gyrosis Gebien, 1920; Heliophosis Koch, 1952; Hesseosis Koch, 1958; Hologenosis Deyrolle, 1867; Latipleurosis Penrith, 1977; Microsis Koch, 1958; Myrmecophosis Koch, 1958; Namaphosis Penrith, 1981; Occidentophosis Penrith, 1977; Oculosis Penrith, 1977; Onychosis Deyrolle, 1867; Ophthalmosis Deyrolle, 1867; Planirostrosis Penrith, 1977; Propemicrosis Penrith, 1981; Protocalosis Penrith, 1977; Protodactylus Koch, 1952; Sabulophosis Penrith, 1977; Scopulophosis Penrith, 1977; Septentriophosis Penrith, 1982; Sulcosis Penrith, 1977; Tarsosis Gebien, 1920; Zophosis Latreille, 1802

= Zophosis =

Genus of beetles

Zophosis, known generally as frantic surface beetles is a genus of darkling beetles in the family Tenebrionidae. They are found in the Palearctic, tropical Africa, and Indomalaya.
