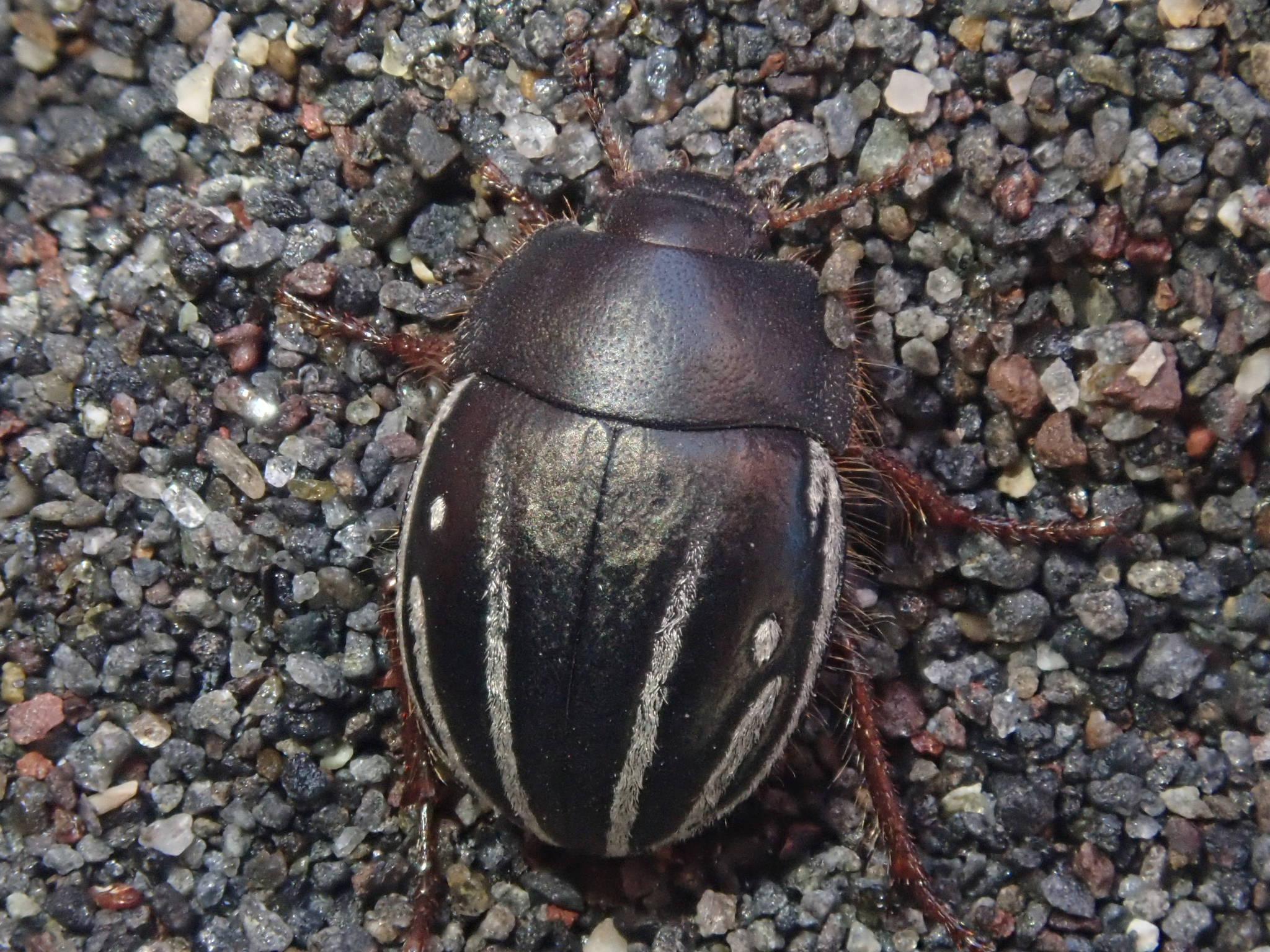
- Praocis rufipes, Chile

Scientific classification
- Domain: Eukaryota
- Kingdom: Animalia
- Phylum: Arthropoda
- Class: Insecta
- Order: Coleoptera
- Suborder: Polyphaga
- Infraorder: Cucujiformia
- Family: Tenebrionidae
- Subfamily: Pimeliinae
- Tribe: Praociini; Eschscholtz, 1829

= Praociini =

Tribe of beetles

Praociini is a tribe of darkling beetles in the subfamily Pimeliinae of the family Tenebrionidae. There are about 15 genera in Praociini, found in the Neotropics.

== Genera ==
These genera belong to the tribe Praociini

- Antofagapraocis Flores, 2000
- Asidelia Fairmaire, 1905
- Calymmophorus Solier, 1841
- Eutelocera Solier, 1841
- Falsopraocis Kulzer, 1958
- Gyrasida Koch, 1962
- Neopraocis Kulzer, 1958
- Parapraocis Flores & Giraldo, 2020
- Patagonopraocis Flores & Chani-Posse, 2005
- Pilobaloderes Kulzer, 1958
- Platesthes G.R. Waterhouse, 1845
- Platyholmus Dejean, 1834
- Praocidia Fairmaire, 1904
- Praocis Eschscholtz, 1829
- Thylacoderes Solier, 1843
