= Caenocrypticini =

Scientific classification
- Kingdom: Animalia
- Phylum: Arthropoda
- Class: Insecta
- Order: Coleoptera
- Suborder: Polyphaga
- Infraorder: Cucujiformia
- Family: Tenebrionidae
- Subfamily: Pimeliinae
- Tribe: Caenocrypticini; Koch, 1958

Tribe of darkling beetles

Caenocrypticini is a tribe of darkling beetles in the subfamily Pimeliinae of the family Tenebrionidae. There are at least two genera in Caenocrypticini.

== Genera ==
These genera belong to the tribe Caenocrypticini

- Caenocrypticoides Kaszab, 1969 (the Neotropics)
- Caenocrypticus Gebien, 1920 (tropical Africa)
