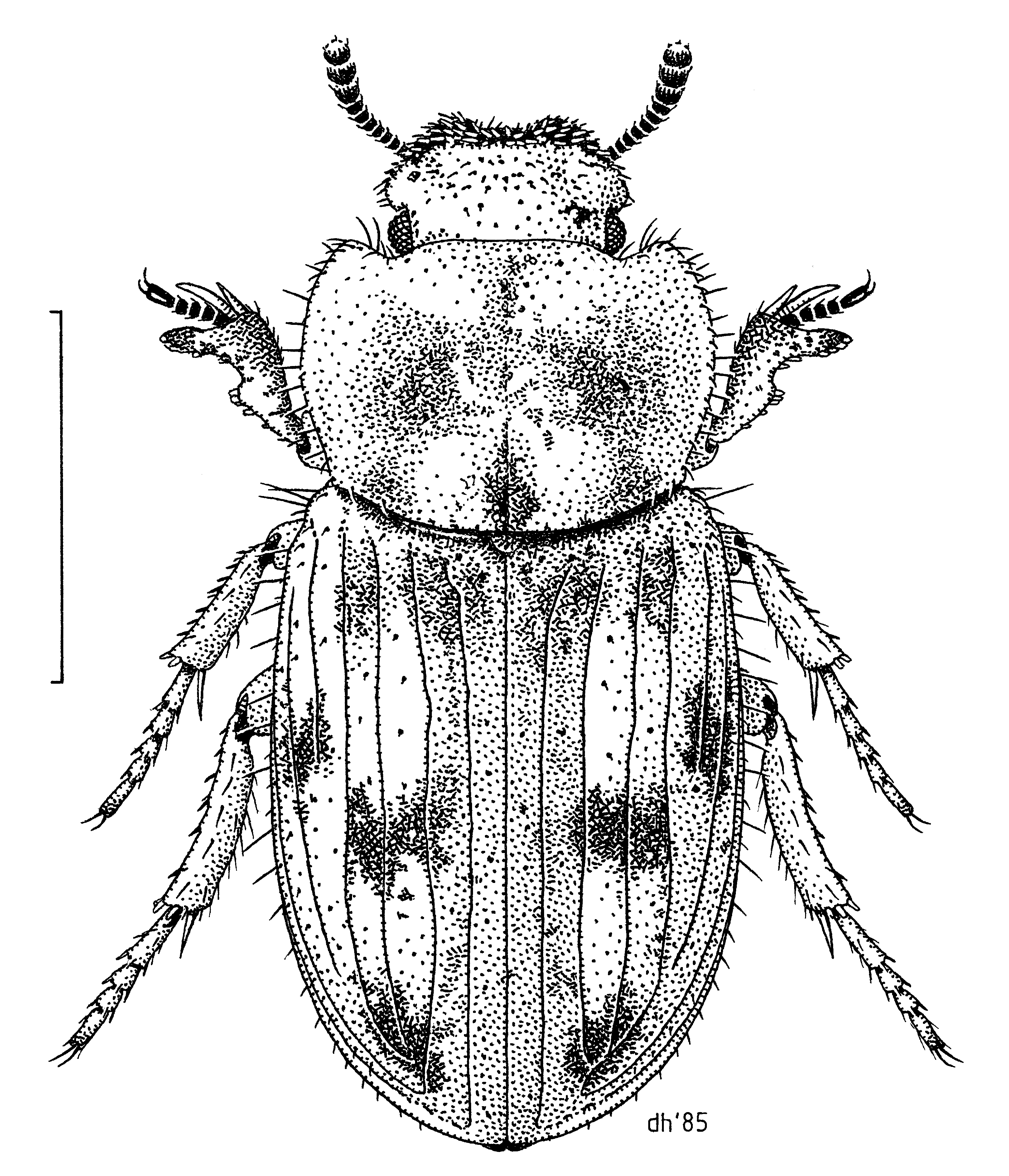
- Actizeta albata illustration

Scientific classification
- Kingdom: Animalia
- Phylum: Arthropoda
- Class: Insecta
- Order: Coleoptera
- Suborder: Polyphaga
- Infraorder: Cucujiformia
- Family: Tenebrionidae
- Subfamily: Pimeliinae
- Tribe: Cnemeplatiini
- Genus: Actizeta; Pascoe, 1875

= Actizeta =

Genus of beetle

Actizeta is a genus of darkling beetle endemic to New Zealand. It was first described in 1875 by Francis Polkinghorne Pascoe from specimens collected in Waikato and Great Barrier Island. They live on sandy beaches. The type species is Actizeta albata.

== Taxonomy ==
There are two species in this genus:

- Actizeta albata Pascoe, 1875
- Actizeta fusca Watt, 1992
