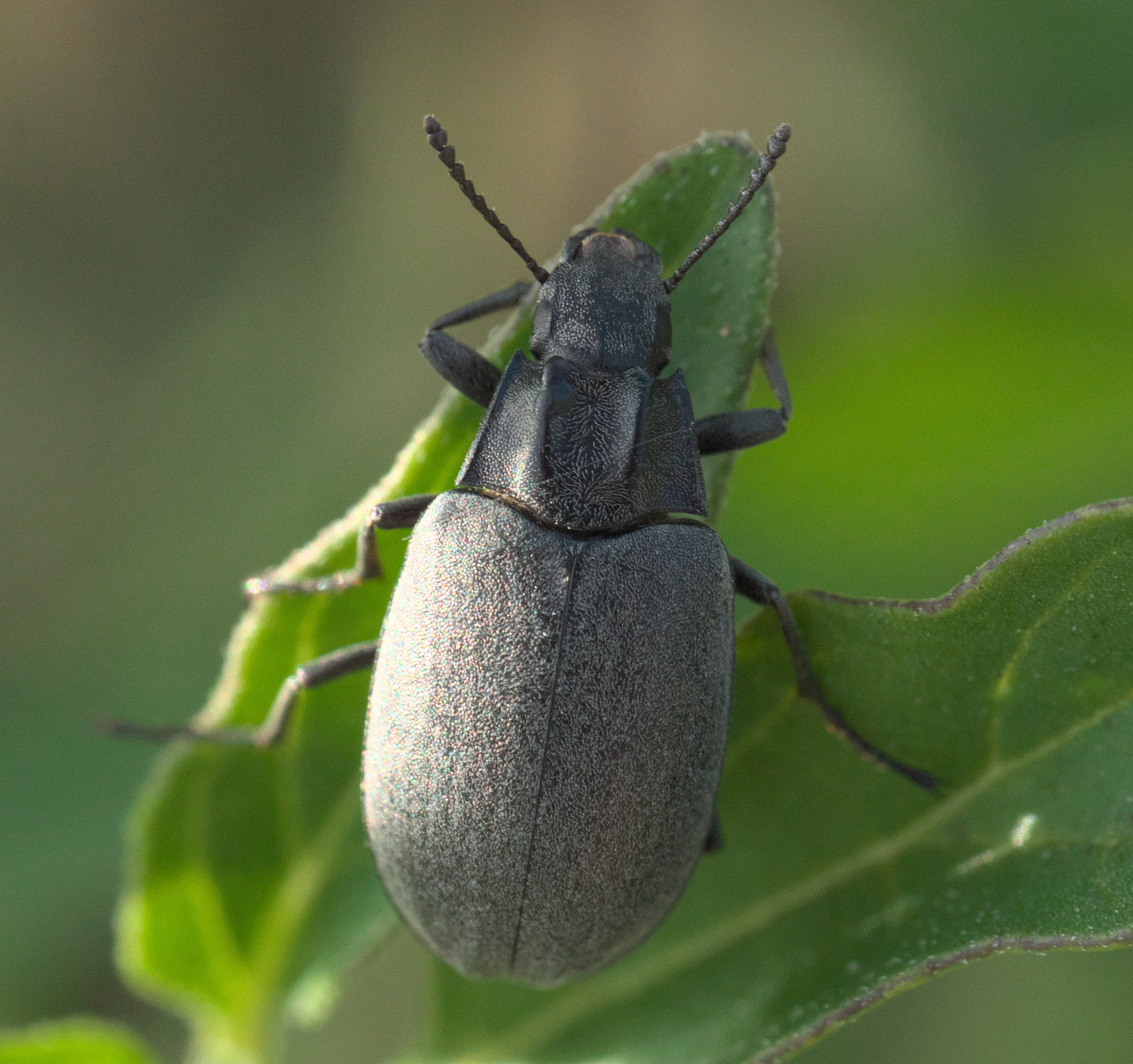

Scientific classification
- Kingdom: Animalia
- Phylum: Arthropoda
- Class: Insecta
- Order: Coleoptera
- Suborder: Polyphaga
- Infraorder: Cucujiformia
- Family: Tenebrionidae
- Genus: Bothrotes
- Species: B. canaliculatus

Binomial name
- Bothrotes canaliculatus (Say)

= Bothrotes canaliculatus =

Species of beetle

Bothrotes canaliculatus is a species of darkling beetle in the family Tenebrionidae.

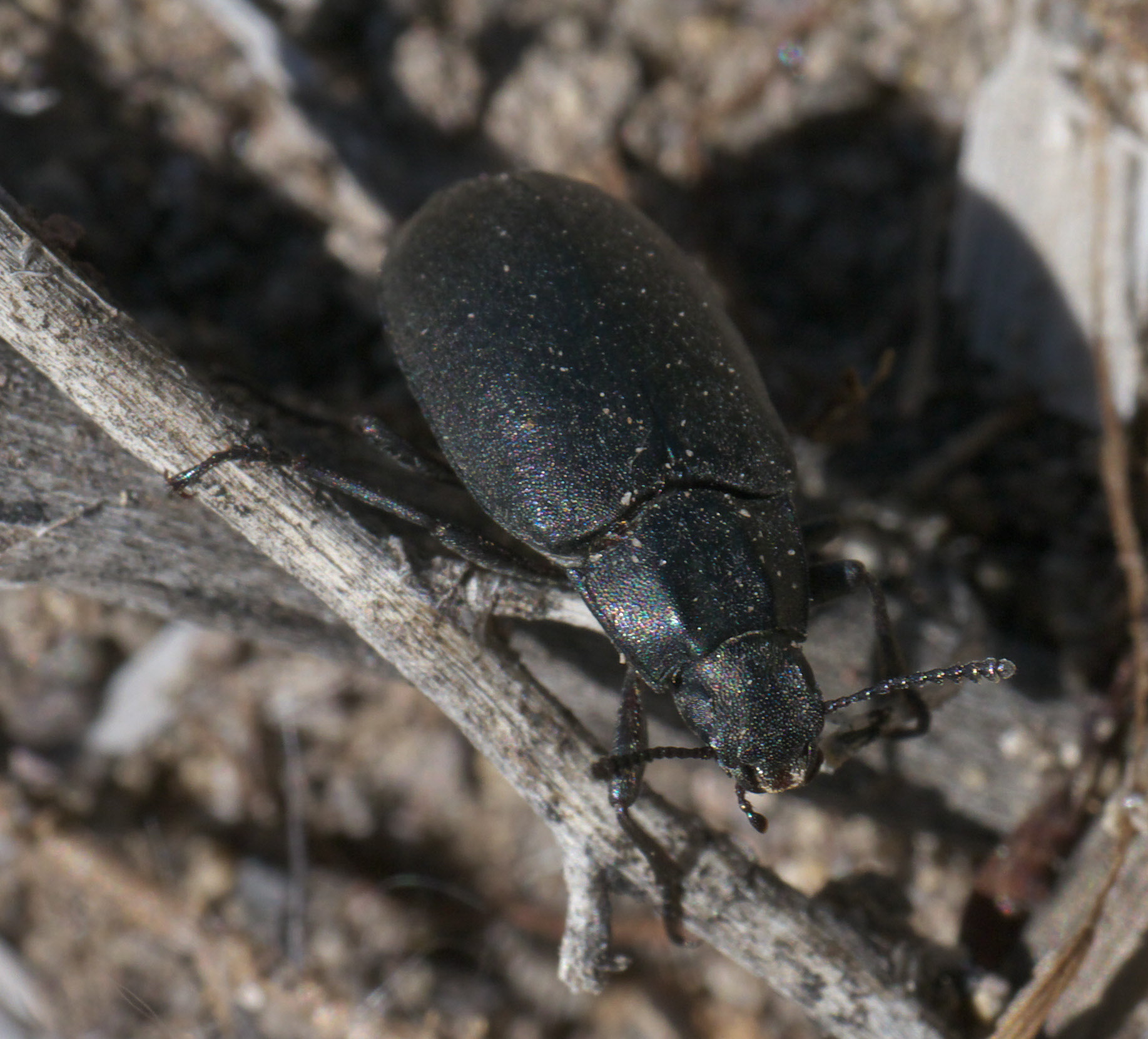
Bothrotes canaliculatus, Southeast of Alamosa, CO, USA

A subspecies of Bothrotes canaliculatus is B. canaliculatus acutus.
