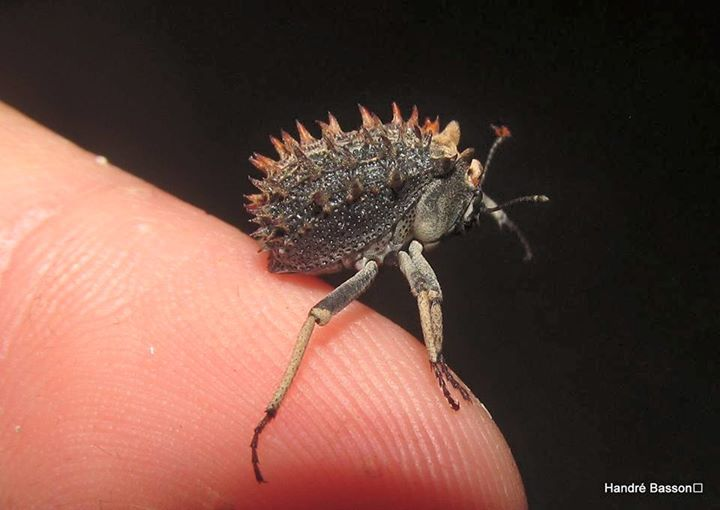
- Cryptochile echinata Fabricius JC 1781 (Gifberg, Namaqualand, South Africa)

Scientific classification
- Kingdom: Animalia
- Phylum: Arthropoda
- Class: Insecta
- Order: Coleoptera
- Suborder: Polyphaga
- Infraorder: Cucujiformia
- Family: Tenebrionidae
- Subfamily: Pimeliinae
- Tribe: Cryptochilini
- Subtribe: Cryptochilina
- Genus: Cryptochile; Latreille in Cuvier, 1829

Species
- Cryptochile affinis (Haag, 1872); Cryptochile assimilis (Solier, 1840); Cryptochile consita (Haag, 1872); Cryptochile costata (Fabricius, 1801); Cryptochile echinata (Fabricius, 1781); Cryptochile elegans (Gerstaecker, 1854); Cryptochile granulata (Haag, 1872); Cryptochile grossa (Erichson, 1843); Cryptochile maculata (Fabricius, 1781); Cryptochile tomentosa (Herbst, 1799)

= Cryptochile =

Genus of beetles

Cryptochile, the Namaqua darkling beetles, is a genus of darkling beetles in the subfamily Pimeliinae.
