= Cnemodinus =

Scientific classification
- Kingdom: Animalia
- Phylum: Arthropoda
- Class: Insecta
- Order: Coleoptera
- Suborder: Polyphaga
- Infraorder: Cucujiformia
- Family: Tenebrionidae
- Subfamily: Pimeliinae
- Tribe: Cnemodinini
- Genus: Cnemodinus; Cockerell, 1906

Genus of beetles

Cnemodinus is a genus of darkling beetles in the family Tenebrionidae. There are at least three described species in Cnemodinus. It is the only genus in the monotypic tribe Cnemodinini.

== Species ==
These species belong to the genus Cnemodinus:

- Cnemodinus angustus Casey, 1907
- Cnemodinus subhyalinus Casey, 1907
- Cnemodinus testaceus (Horn, 1870)
