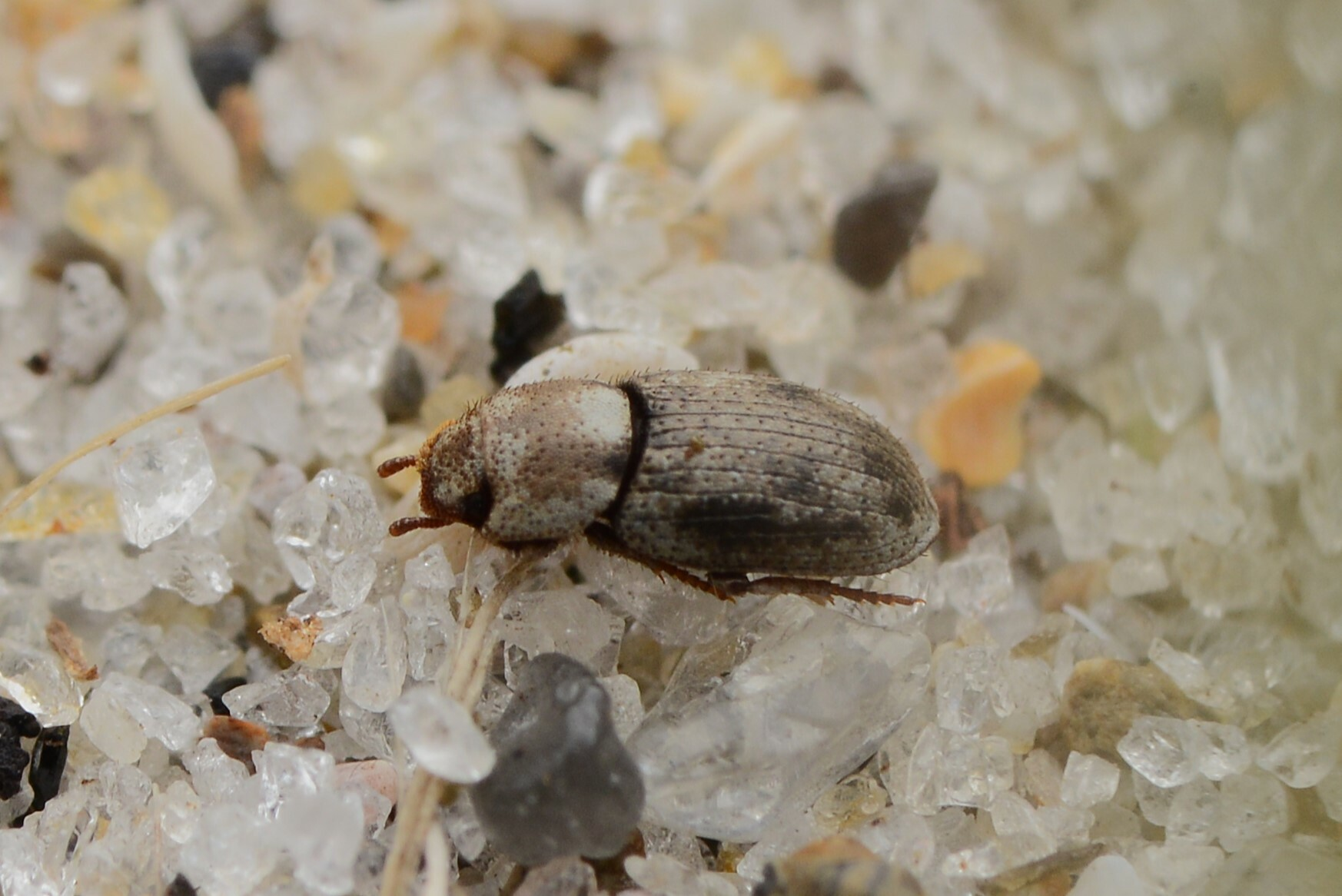

Scientific classification
- Kingdom: Animalia
- Phylum: Arthropoda
- Class: Insecta
- Order: Coleoptera
- Suborder: Polyphaga
- Infraorder: Cucujiformia
- Family: Tenebrionidae
- Genus: Actizeta
- Species: A. fusca

Binomial name
- Actizeta fusca Watt, 1992

= Actizeta fusca =

Species of beetle

Actizeta fusca is a species of darkling beetle endemic to New Zealand.

== Taxonomy ==
This species was first described in 1992 by John Charles Watt. The holotype is stored in the New Zealand Arthropod Collection under registration number NZAC04095549.

== Description ==
As adults, Actizeta fusca are 2.61-2.9mm in length. They are similar to Actizeta albata, but can be distinguished by differences in the shape of the anterior tibia and eyes, and the colour of the scales, body, and antennae. On the outer edge of the front tibia there is a slight depression. The eyes are reduced and less noticeable than in A. albata. The body is brown and is covered in scales that are mostly whitish, but may be dark. These light and dark scales form markings on the body. The antennae is brown.

== Distribution ==
These beetles are endemic to New Zealand, where they live on sandy beaches. They are known from scattered localities throughout the North Island and from the Nelson region in the South Island.
