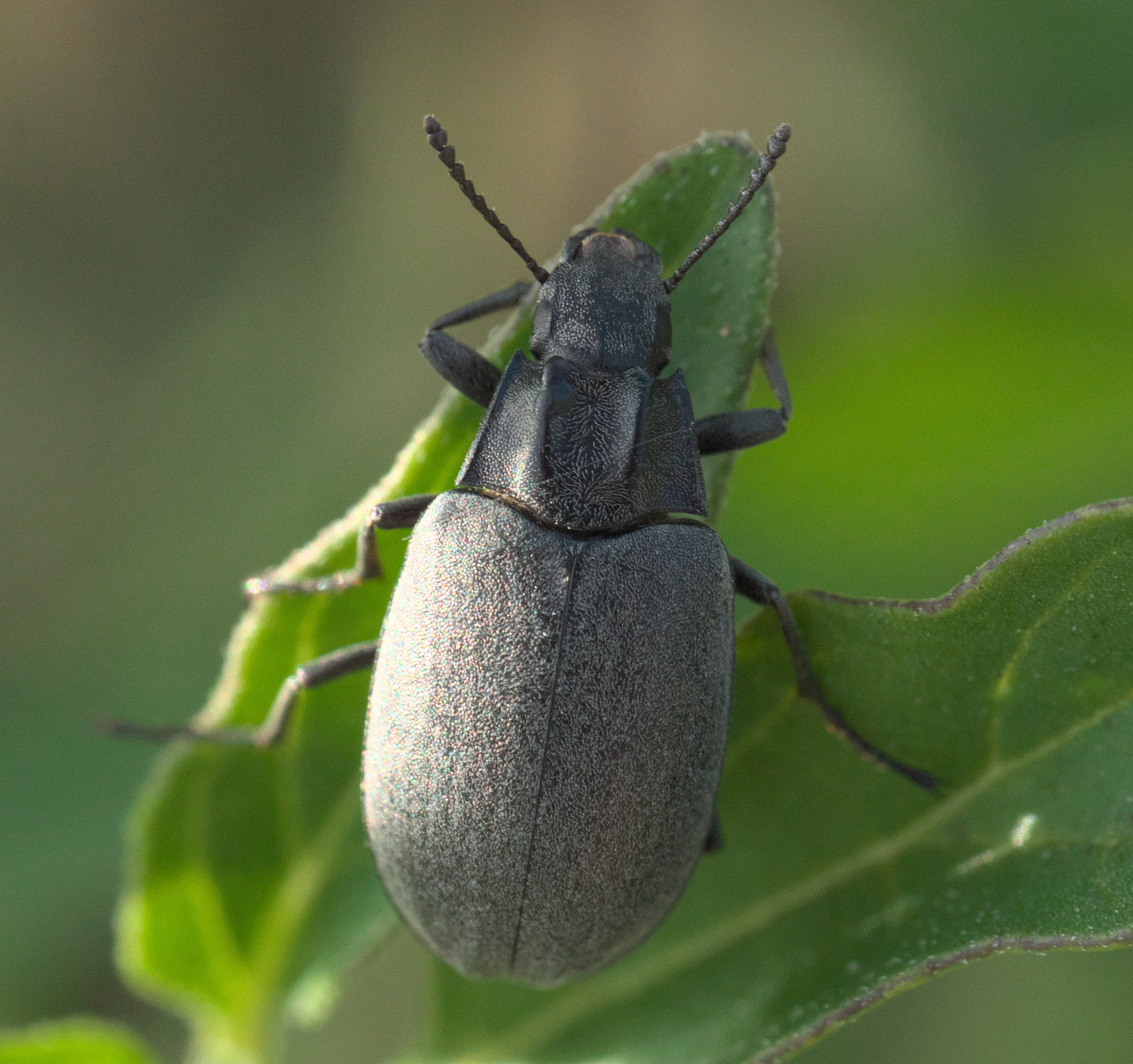
- Bothrotes canaliculatus

Scientific classification
- Kingdom: Animalia
- Phylum: Arthropoda
- Clade: Pancrustacea
- Class: Insecta
- Order: Coleoptera
- Suborder: Polyphaga
- Infraorder: Cucujiformia
- Family: Tenebrionidae
- Tribe: Epitragini
- Genus: Bothrotes; Casey, 1907

= Bothrotes =

Genus of beetles

Bothrotes is a genus of darkling beetles in the family Tenebrionidae. There are at least 2 described species in Bothrotes.

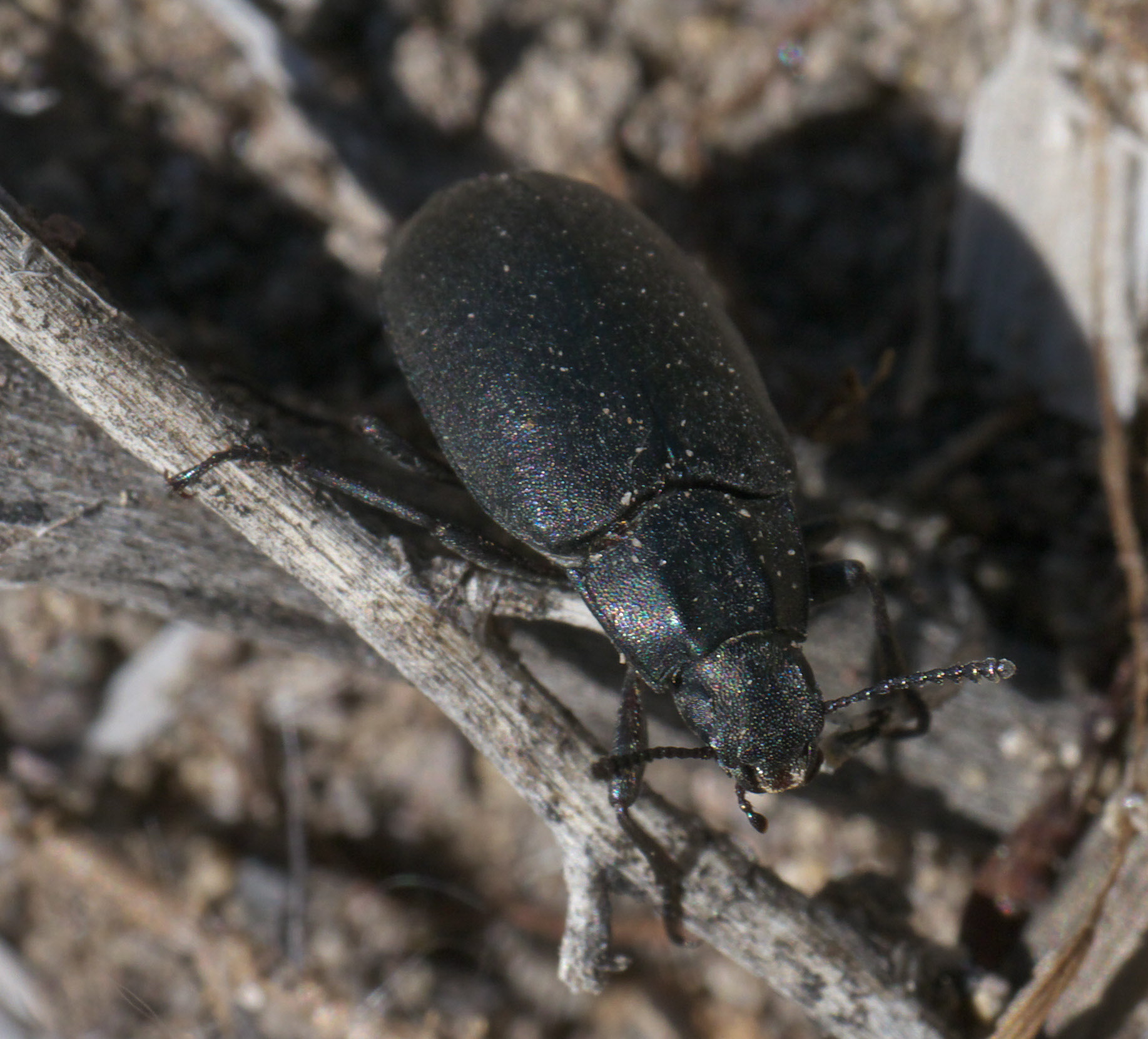
Bothrotes canaliculatus

== Species ==
- Bothrotes canaliculatus (Say)
- Bothrotes plumbeus
