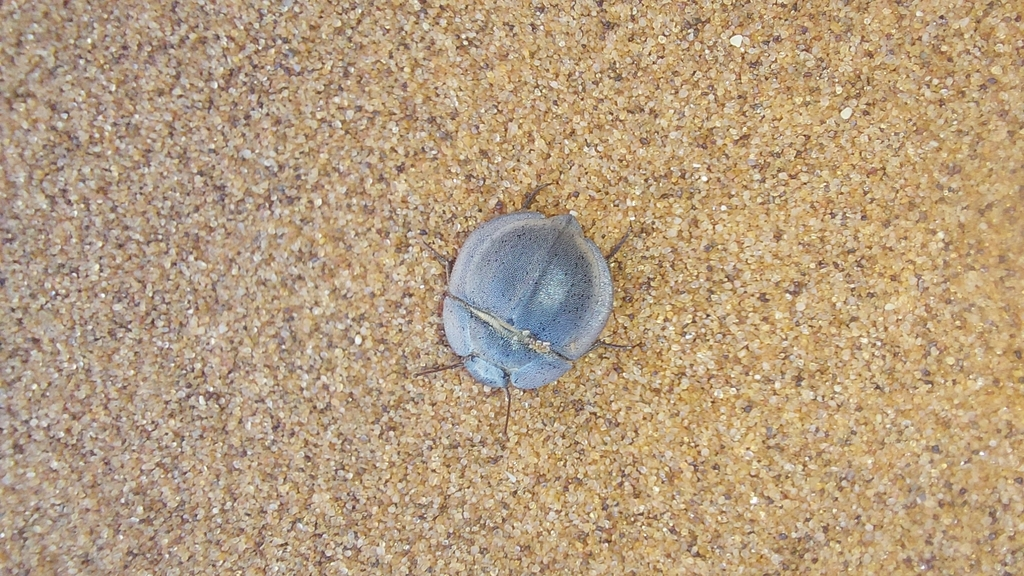
- Lepidochora discoidalis argentogrisea

Scientific classification
- Kingdom: Animalia
- Phylum: Arthropoda
- Clade: Pancrustacea
- Class: Insecta
- Order: Coleoptera
- Suborder: Polyphaga
- Infraorder: Cucujiformia
- Family: Tenebrionidae
- Genus: Lepidochora; Koch, 1952

Synonyms
- Lepidichora Gebien, 1938

= Lepidochora =

Genus of beetles

Lepidochora is a genus of darkling beetles distributed along the western African coast from southern Angola, through Namibia, to norther South Africa. It is commonly known as the flying saucer beetles. They have been observed digging trenches on sand dunes and returning to collect water condensation that collected in the trenches during a fog.

== Species ==
The user-supplied website iNaturalist lists the following species to this genus. No other database lists any species.

- Lepidochora diaphana
- Lepidochora discoidalis
- Lepidochora eberlanzi
- Lepidochora kahani
- Lepidochora nocturna
- Lepidochora pilosa
- Lepidochora porti
