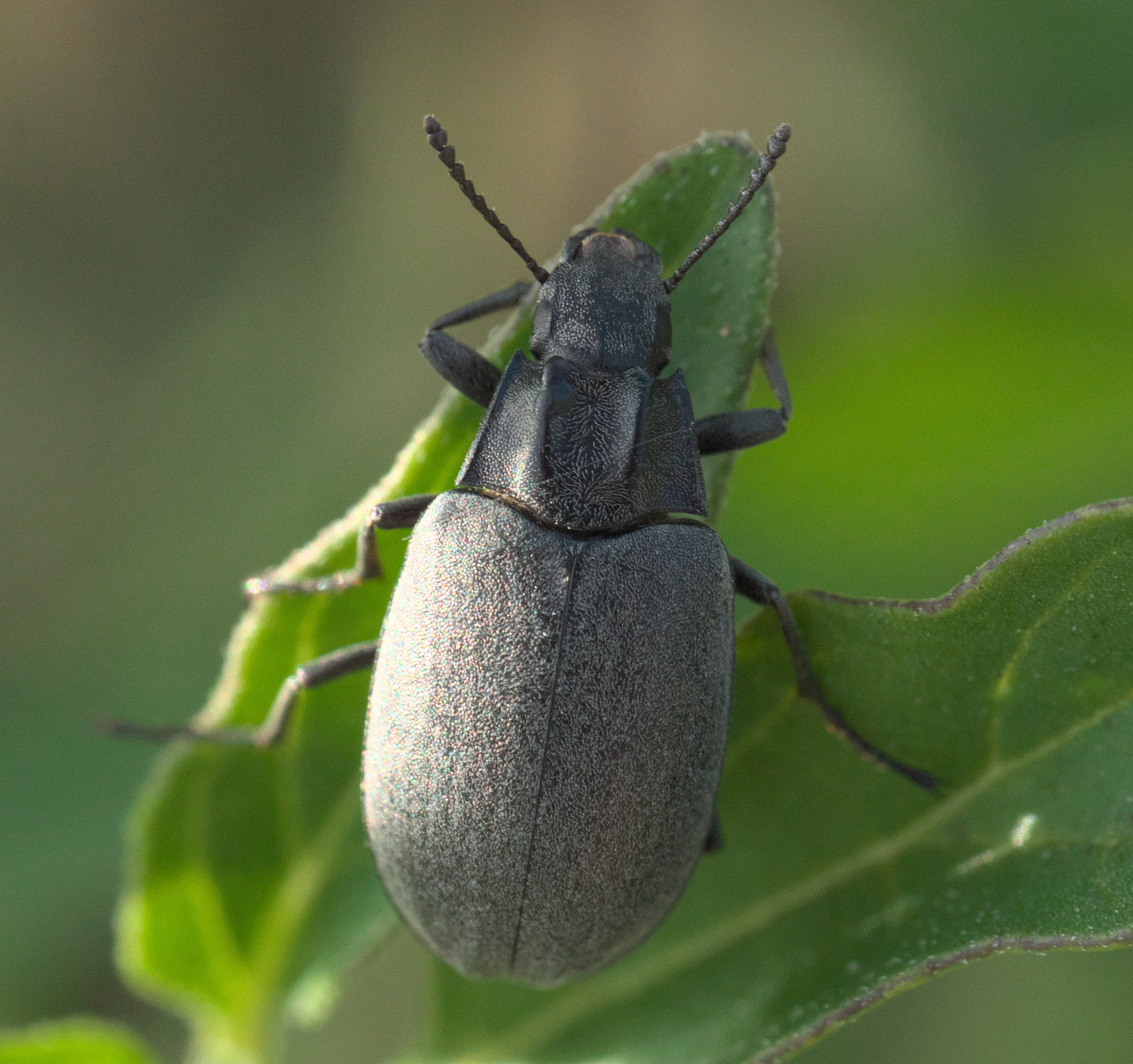
- Bothrotes canaliculatus, Colorado

Scientific classification
- Kingdom: Animalia
- Phylum: Arthropoda
- Class: Insecta
- Order: Coleoptera
- Suborder: Polyphaga
- Infraorder: Cucujiformia
- Family: Tenebrionidae
- Subfamily: Pimeliinae
- Tribe: Epitragini; Blanchard, 1845

= Epitragini =

Tribe of beetles

Epitragini is a tribe of darkling beetles in the subfamily Pimeliinae of the family Tenebrionidae. There are more than 30 genera in Epitragini, found in the North, Central, and South America.

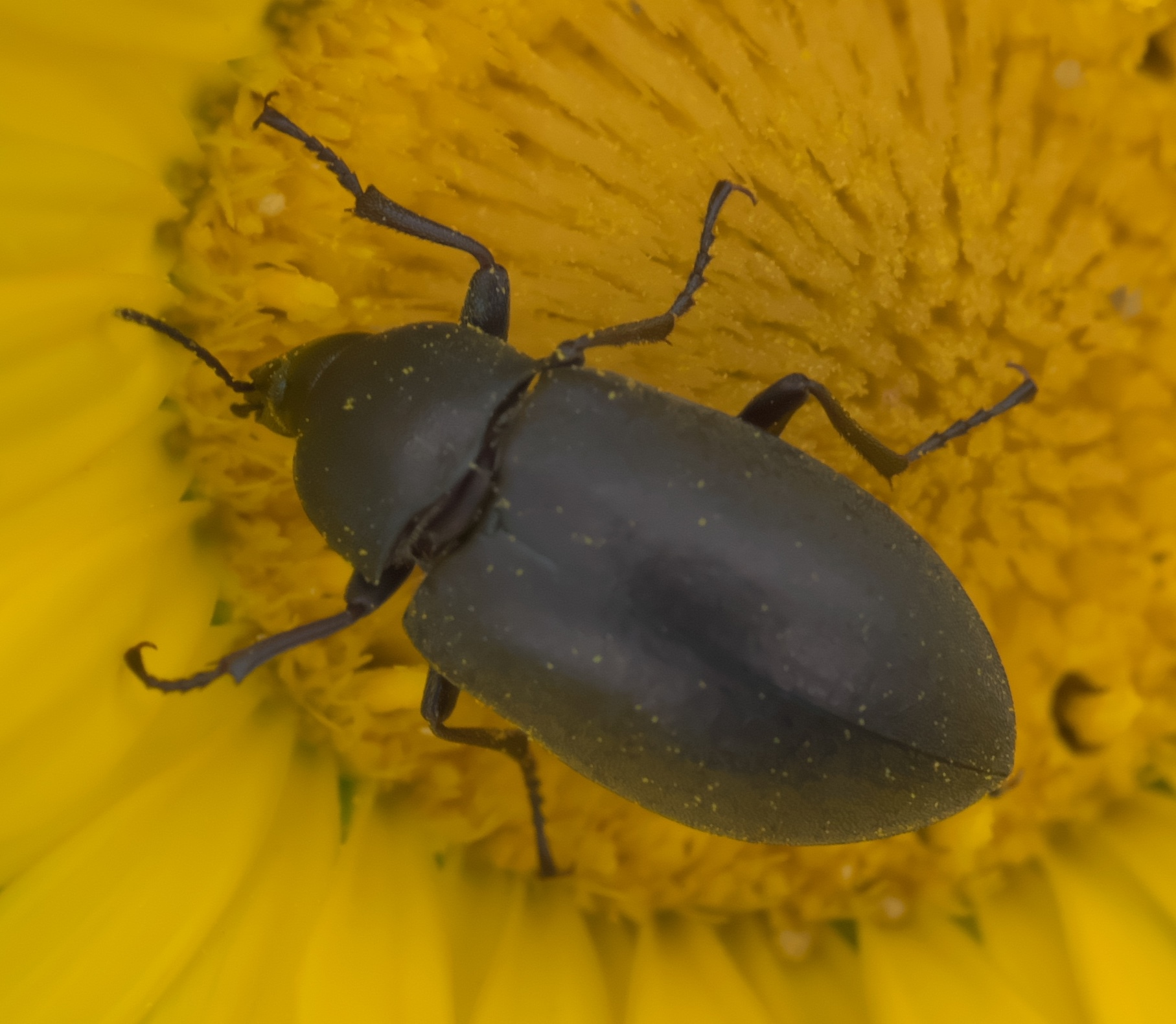
Epitragini, Kansas

== Genera ==
These genera belong to the tribe Epitragini

- Aspidolobus Redtenbacher, 1868 (the Neotropics)
- Bothrotes Casey, 1907 (North America and the Neotropics)
- Conoecus Horn, 1885 (North America)
- Cyrtomius Casey, 1907 (the Neotropics)
- Ecnomosternum Gebien, 1928 (the Neotropics)
- Epitragella Kulzer, 1958 (the Neotropics)
- Epitragodes Casey, 1890 (North America and the Neotropics)
- Epitragopsis Casey, 1907 (the Neotropics)
- Epitragosoma Brown & Triplehorn, 2002 (North America)
- Epitragus Latreille, 1802 (the Neotropics)
- Eunotiodes Casey, 1907 (the Neotropics)
- Geoborus Blanchard, 1842 (the Neotropics)
- Hemasodes Casey, 1907 (the Neotropics)
- Hypselops Solier, 1851 (the Neotropics)
- Kaszabus Freude, 1967 (the Neotropics)
- Lobometopon Casey, 1907 (North America and the Neotropics)
- Metopoloba Casey, 1907 (North America)
- Nyctopetus Guérin-Méneville, 1831 (the Neotropics)
- Omopheres Casey, 1907 (the Neotropics)
- Ortheolus Casey, 1907 (the Neotropics)
- Parepitragus Casey, 1907 (the Neotropics)
- Pechalius Casey, 1907 (North America and the Neotropics)
- Pectinepitragus Pic, 1927 (the Neotropics)
- Penaus Freude, 1968 (the Neotropics)
- Phegoneus Casey, 1907 (North America and the Neotropics)
- Phitophilus Guérin-Méneville, 1831 (the Neotropics)
- Polemiotus Casey, 1907 (North America and the Neotropics)
- Pseudortheolus Freude, 1968 (the Neotropics)
- Pseudothinobatis Bouchard & Bousquet, 2021 (the Neotropics)
- Schoenicus Leconte, 1866 (North America and the Neotropics)
- Stictodere Gebien, 1928 (the Neotropics)
- Tapinocomus Gebien, 1928 (the Neotropics)
- Tydeolus Champion, 1884 (the Neotropics)
