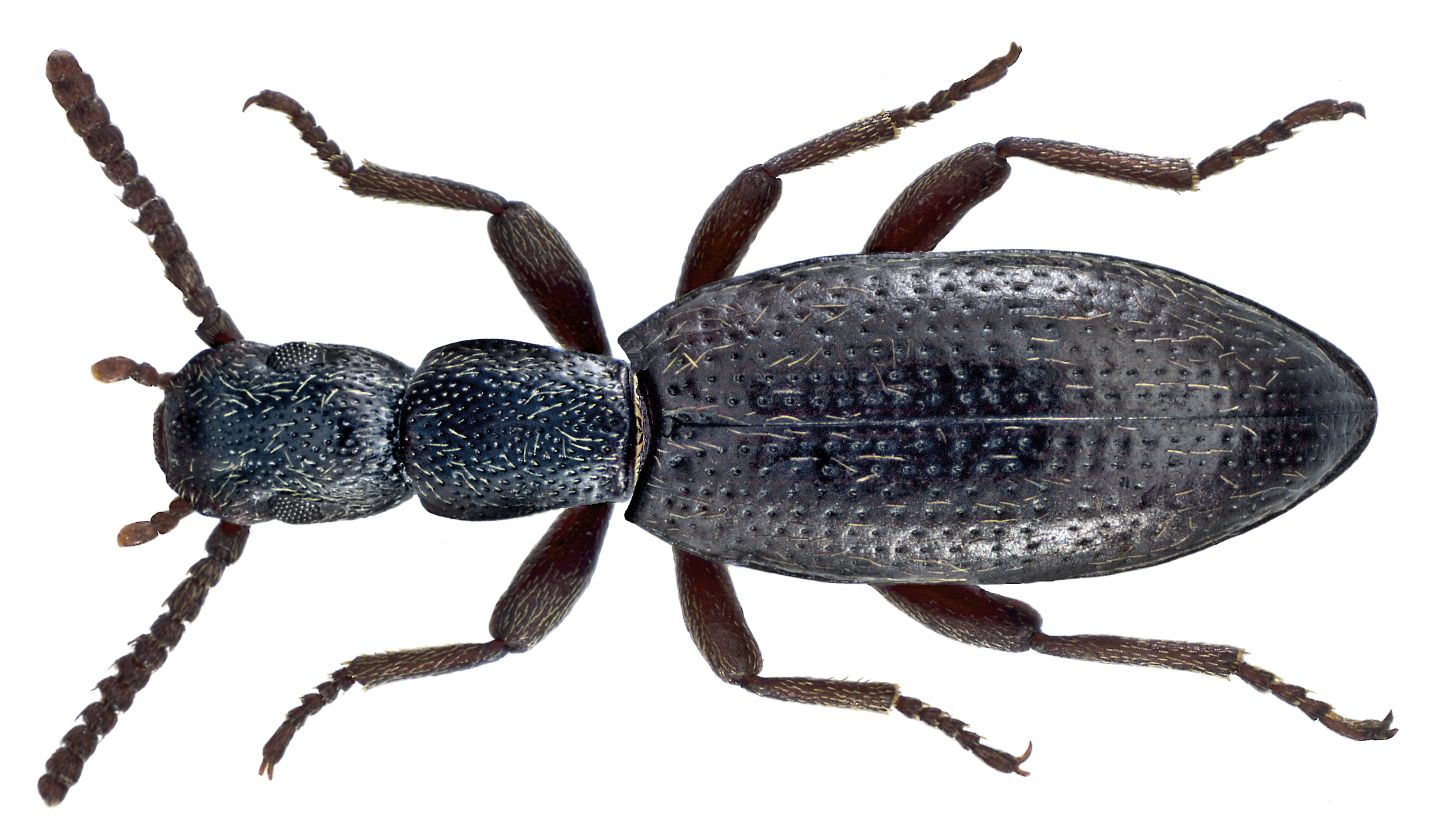
- Stenosis sardoa, Italy

Scientific classification
- Kingdom: Animalia
- Phylum: Arthropoda
- Clade: Pancrustacea
- Class: Insecta
- Order: Coleoptera
- Suborder: Polyphaga
- Infraorder: Cucujiformia
- Family: Tenebrionidae
- Subfamily: Pimeliinae
- Tribe: Stenosini; Schaum, 1859 (1834)

Subtribes
- Araeoschizina Casey, 1907; Dichillina Reitter, 1916; Harvengiina Ferrer, 2004; Platamodina Reitter, 1900; Stenosina Schaum, 1859 (1834); Typhlusechina Casey, 1907

= Stenosini =

Tribe of beetles

Stenosini is a tribe of darkling beetles in the subfamily Pimeliinae of the family Tenebrionidae. There are more than 40 genera in Stenosini.

== Genera ==
These genera belong to the tribe Stenosini

- Afghanillus Kaszab, 1960 (the Palearctic)
- Anchomma LeConte, 1858 (North America)
- Anethas Jakobson, 1924 (tropical Africa)
- Araeoschizus LeConte, 1851 (North America)
- Aspidocephalus Motschulsky, 1839 (the Palearctic)
- Caribanosis Nabozhenko, Kirejtshuk, Merkl, Varela, Aalbu & Smith, 2016 (the Neotropics)
- Dichillus Jacquelin du Val, 1860 (the Palearctic)
- Discopleurus Lacordaire, 1859 (the Neotropics)
- Ecnomoderes Gebien, 1928 (the Neotropics)
- Ethas Pascoe, 1862 (Indomalaya)
- Eutagenia Reitter, 1886 (the Palearctic)
- Fitzsimonsium Koch, 1962 (tropical Africa)
- Gebieniella Koch, 1940 (Indomalaya)
- Grammicus G.R. Waterhouse, 1845 (the Neotropics)
- Harvengia Ferrer, 2004 (Indomalaya)
- Herbertfranzia Kaszab, 1973 (Indomalaya)
- Herbertfranziella Kaszab, 1973 (the Palearctic and Indomalaya)
- Hexagonochilus Solier, 1851 (the Neotropics)
- Indochillus Koch, 1941 (Indomalaya)
- Indostola G.S. Medvedev, 1991 (Indomalaya)
- Itampolis Koch, 1962 (tropical Africa)
- Microblemma Semenov, 1889 (the Palearctic)
- Microtelopsis Koch, 1940 (the Palearctic and Indomalaya)
- Microtelus Solier, 1838 (the Palearctic)
- Mitotagenia Reitter, 1916 (the Palearctic and tropical Africa)
- Nepalofranziella Fouquè, 2013 (Indomalaya)
- Oogaster Faldermann, 1837 (the Palearctic)
- Perdicus Fairmaire, 1899 (tropical Africa)
- Platamodes Ménétriés, 1849 (the Palearctic)
- Pseudethas Fairmaire, 1896 (the Palearctic and Indomalaya)
- Pseudochillus Fouquè, 2015 (Indomalaya)
- Reitterella Semenov, 1891 (the Palearctic)
- Renefouqueosis Aalbu, Smith, Kanda & Bouchard, 2017 (the Neotropics)
- Schizaraeus Kulzer, 1955 (the Neotropics)
- Schusteriella Koch, 1940 (tropical Africa)
- Stenosethas Kaszab, 1975 (Indomalaya)
- Stenosis Herbst, 1799 (the Palearctic, tropical Africa, and Indomalaya)
- Tagenostola Reitter, 1916 (the Palearctic and Indomalaya)
- Tetranillus Wasmann, 1899 (the Palearctic and Indomalaya)
- Timosmithus Ardoin, 1974 (tropical Africa)
- Typhlusechus Linell, 1897 (North America)
- † Miostenosis Wickham, 1913
