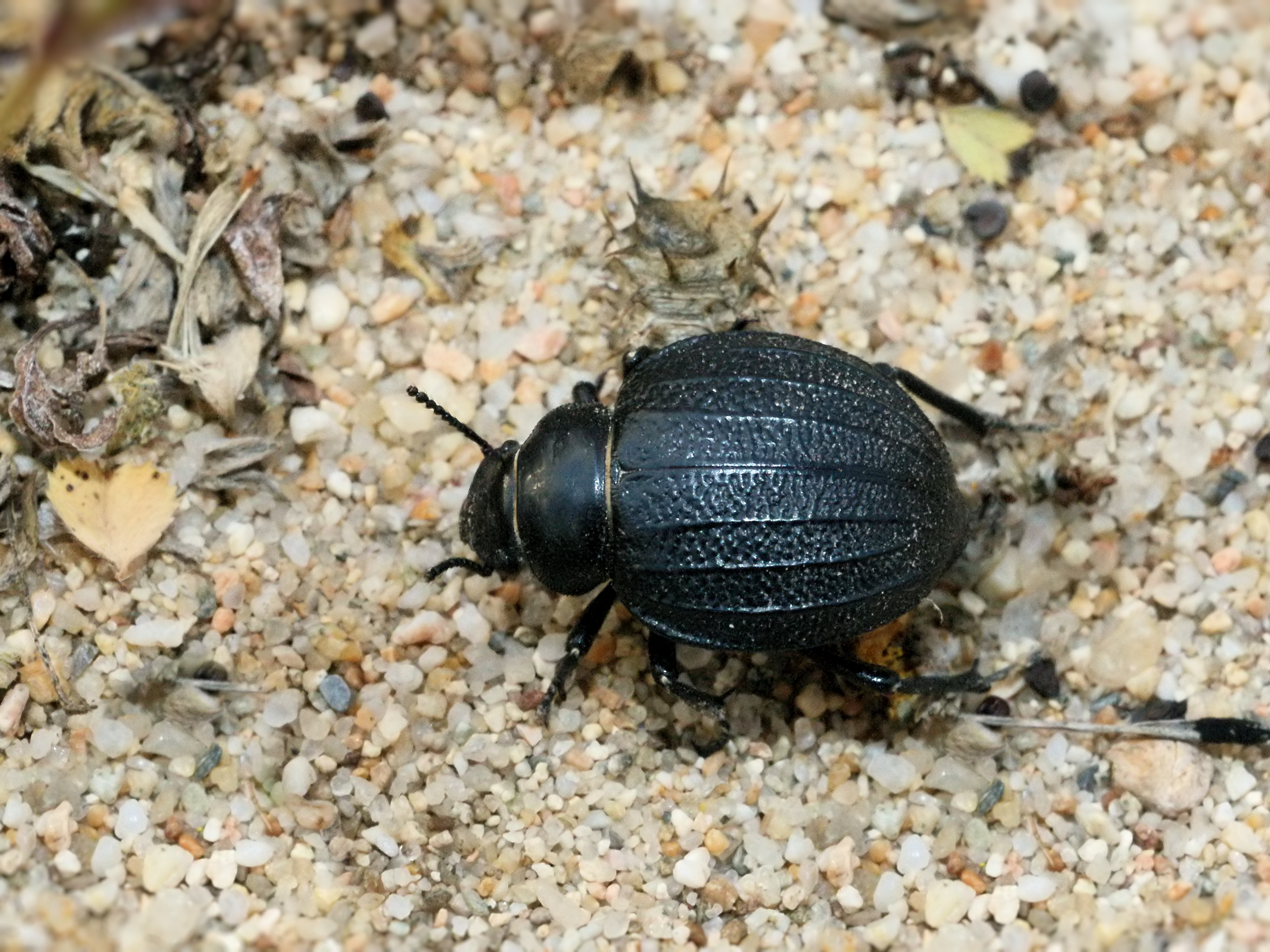
- Pimelia bipunctata

Scientific classification
- Kingdom: Animalia
- Phylum: Arthropoda
- Clade: Pancrustacea
- Class: Insecta
- Order: Coleoptera
- Suborder: Polyphaga
- Infraorder: Cucujiformia
- Family: Tenebrionidae
- Subfamily: Pimeliinae; Latreille, 1802

Synonyms
- Pimeliariae Latreille, 1802; Tentyriinae Eschscholtz, 183

= Pimeliinae =

Subfamily of beetles

Pimeliinae is a subfamily of beetles in the family Tenebrionidae.

== Selected genera ==
- Tribus Adelostomini
  - Adelostoma
  - Carinosella
  - Eurychora
  - Prunaspila
- Tribus Adesmiini
  - Adesmia
  - Alogenius
  - Cauricara
  - Ceradesmia
  - Coeladesmia
  - Epiphysa
  - Metriopus
  - Onymacris
  - Physadesmia
  - Physosterna
  - Renatiella
  - Stenocara
  - Stenodesia
- Tribus Akidini
  - Akis
  - Cyphogenia
  - Morica
  - Sarothropus
  - Solskyia
- Tribus Anepsiini
  - Anchoma
  - Anepsius
  - Batuliodes
  - Batuliomorpha
  - Batulius
- Tribus Asidini
  - Afrasida
  - Alphasida
  - Andremiopsis
  - Andremius
  - Ardamimicus
  - Asida
  - Asidesthes
  - Cardigenius
  - Craniotus
  - Euryprosternum
  - Ferveoventer
  - Heterasida
  - Leptasida
  - Litasida
  - Machla
  - Machleida
  - Machlomorpha
  - Micrasida
  - Microschatia
  - Oxyge
  - Parecatus
  - Pelecyphorus
  - Prosodidius
  - Pseudasida
  - Scotinesthes
  - Scotinus
  - Stenomorpha
- Tribus Boromorphini
  - Boromorphus
- Tribus Caenocrypticini
  - Caenocrypticoides
  - Caenocrypticus
- Tribus Cnemeplatiini
  - Actizeta
  - Cnemeplatia
  - Lepidocnemeplatia
  - Philhammus
  - Rondoniella
  - Thorictosoma
  - Wattiana
- Tribus Cnemodinini
  - Cnemodinus
- Tribus Cryptochilini
  - Calognathus
  - Cerasoma
  - Cryptochile
  - Homebius
  - Vansonium
- Tribus Cryptoglossini
  - Asbolus
  - Cryptoglossa
  - Schizillus
- Tribus Epitragini
  - Bothrotes
  - Cyrtomius
  - Epitragus
  - Epitrichia
  - Hymatismus
  - Lobometopon
  - Phegoneus
  - Schoenicus
- Tribus Erodiini
  - Ammodoides
  - Ammozoides
  - Ammozoum
  - Amnodeis
  - Anodesis
  - Apantodes
  - Apentanes
  - Apentanodes
  - Arthrodeis
  - Arthrodibius
  - Arthrodinus
  - Arthrodion
  - Arthrodosis
  - Arthrodygmus
  - Arthrohyalosis
  - Bulbulus
  - Capricephalus
  - Diaphanidus
  - Diodontes
  - Erodiontes
  - Erodius
  - Falsarthrosis
  - Foleya
  - Globularthrodosis
  - Histeromimus
  - Histeromorphus
  - Hyalarthrodosis
  - Hyalerodius
  - Iranerodius
  - Leptonychoides
  - Leptonychus
  - Piestognathoides
  - Piestognathus
  - Pseudodiaphanidus
  - Rasphytus
  - Spyrathus
- Tribus Lachnogyini
  - Lachnogya
  - Netuschilia
- Tribus Nycteliini
  - Auladera
  - Callyntra
  - Entomobalia
  - Entomoderes
  - Epipedonota
  - Gyriosomus
  - Mitragenius
  - Nyctelia
  - Patagonogenius
  - Pilobalia
  - Psectrascelis
  - Scelidospecta
- Tribus Pimeliini
  - Argyrophana
  - Diesia
  - Graecopachys
  - Lasiostola
  - Ocnera
  - Pachyscelis
  - Pimelia
  - Platyesia
  - Platyope
  - Podhomala
  - Pterocoma
  - Sternoplax
  - Trachyderma
  - Trigonocnera
  - Trigonoscelis
- Tribus Praociini
  - Antofagapraocis
  - Asidelia
  - Falsopraocis
  - Gyrasida
  - Neopraocis
  - Patagonopraocis
  - Pilobaloderes
  - Platesthes
  - Praocidia
  - Praocis
  - Thylacoderes
- Tribus Scotobiini
  - Emmallodera
  - Scotobius
- Tribus Sepidiini
  - Bombocnodolus
  - Decoriplus
  - Dichtha
  - Moluris
  - Ocnodes
  - Tarsocnodes
  - Microphligra
  - Phligra
  - Somaticus
  - Trachynotus
- Tribus Stenosini
  - Aspidocephalus
  - Dichillus
  - Eutagenia
  - Microblemma
  - Microtelus
  - Nepalofranziella
  - Pseudethas
  - Reitterella
  - Rhypasma
  - Stenosis
  - Tagenostola
- Tribus Tentyriini
  - Anatolica
  - Archinamaqua
  - Calyptopsis
  - Dailognatha
  - Dichomma
  - Eulipus
  - Hegeter
  - Melanochrus
  - Melaxumia
  - Mesostena
  - Microdera
  - Oxycara
  - Oxycarops
  - Pachychila
  - Paivaea
  - Psammocryptus
  - Scythis
  - Tentyria
  - Tentyrina
- Tribus Zophosini
  - Anisosis
  - Calosis
  - Gyrosis
  - Microsis
  - Occidentophosis
  - Onychosis
  - Zophosis
