= Toktokkie =

Toktokkie or tok-tokkie may refer to:

- Various species of African darkling or Tenebrionid beetle of which the males strike their abdomens on the ground in order to attract mates that respond with their own tapping, thereby making a rapid tapping sound ("tok, tok") of which its name is an onomatopoeia
- An old children’s game in South Africa that involves knocking on a door and running away before it is answered
- Dichtha spp.
- Zophosis spp.
- Psammodes spp.
- Molurini spp.
- Onymacris unguicularis

== See also ==
- Toktokkies
