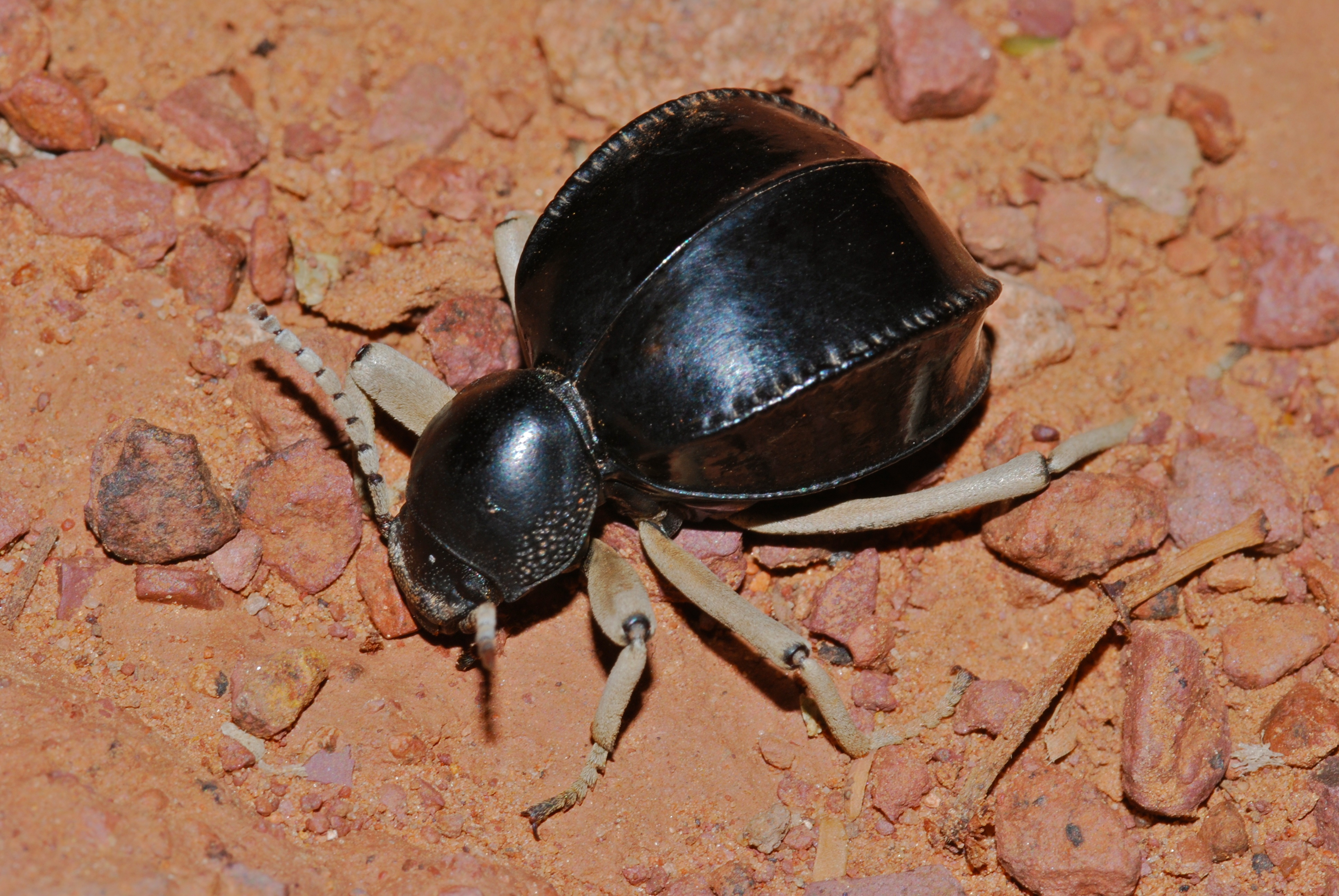
- Dichtha cubica

Scientific classification
- Kingdom: Animalia
- Phylum: Arthropoda
- Class: Insecta
- Order: Coleoptera
- Suborder: Polyphaga
- Infraorder: Cucujiformia
- Family: Tenebrionidae
- Subfamily: Pimeliinae
- Tribe: Sepidiini
- Subtribe: Molurina; Solier, 1843

Type genus
- Moluris Latreille, 1802

= Molurina =

Subtribe of beetles

Molurina is a subtribe of darkling beetles in the family Tenebrionidae. There are 28 genera and 579 described species and subspecies in subtribe Molurina. The type genus for this subtribe is Moluris. These beetles are widely distributed through the Afrotropics, with the exception of western Africa.

== Genera ==
There are 28 genera belonging to the subtribe Molurina:

- Amiantus (Fåhreus, 1870)
- Argenticrinis (Louw)
- Arturium (Koch, 1951)
- Bombocnodulus (Koch)
- Brachyphrynus (Fairmaire, 1882)
- Chiliarchum (Koch)
- Dichtha (Haag-Rutenberg, 1871)
- Distretus (Haag-Rutenberg, 1871)
- Euphrynus (Fairmaire, 1897)
- Glyptophrynus (Fairmaire, 1899)
- Huilamus (Koch)
- Mariazofia (Kamiński, 2022)
- Melanolophus (Fairmaire, 1882)
- Moluris (Latreille, 1802)
- Ocnodes (Fåhraeus)
- Piesomera (Solier)
- Phrynocolus (Lacordaire, 1859)
- Phrynophanes (Koch, 1951)
- Physophrynus (Fairmaire, 1882)
- Psammodes (Kirby, 1819)
- Psammophanes (Lesne, 1922)
- Psammorhyssus (Kolby)
- Psammotyria (Koch, 1953)
- Stridulomus (Koch)
- Tarsocnodes (Gebien)
- Toktokkus (Kamiński & Gearner, 2022)
- Tibiocnodes (Gearner & Kamiński, 2022)
- Tuberocnodes (Gearner & Kamiński, 2022)
