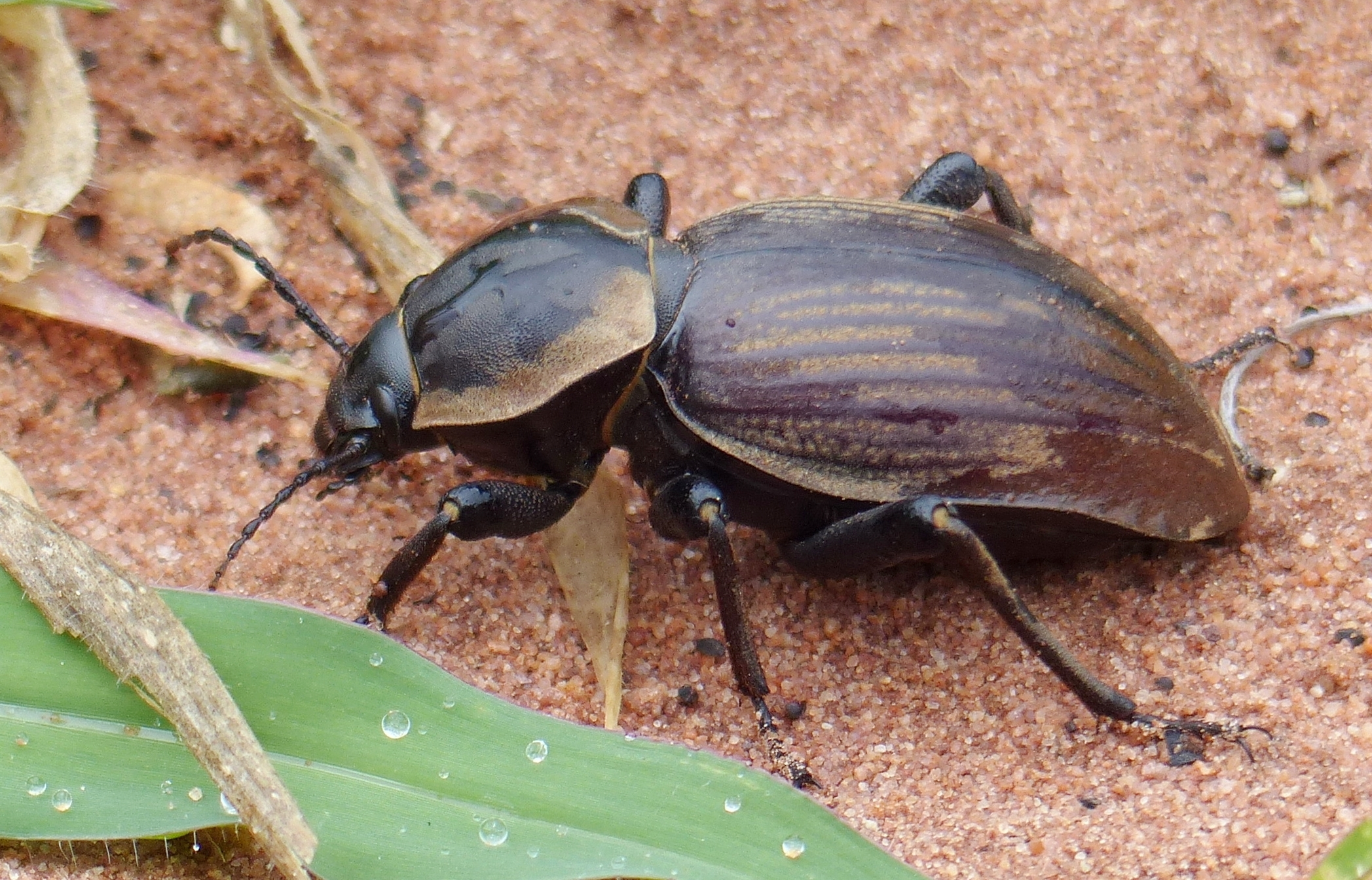
- Phanerotomeina

Scientific classification
- Kingdom: Animalia
- Phylum: Arthropoda
- Class: Insecta
- Order: Coleoptera
- Suborder: Polyphaga
- Infraorder: Cucujiformia
- Family: Tenebrionidae
- Subfamily: Pimeliinae
- Tribe: Sepidiini
- Subtribe: Phanerotomeina; Koch, 1958

Type genus
- Phanerotomea (=Ocnodes) Koch, 1958

= Phanerotomeina =

Subtribe of beetles

Phanerotomeina is a subtribe of darkling beetles in the family Tenebrionidae. There are about 5 genera and more than 150 described species in Phanerotomeina, found mainly in the southern part of the Afrotropics. Only two species were described north of the equator.

== Genera ==
These genera belong to the subtribe Phanerotomeina:

- Chiliarchum Koch, 1954
- Huilamus Koch, 1953
- Ocnodes Fåhraeus, 1870
- Psammoryssus Kolbe, 1886
- Stridulomus Koch, 1955
- Tarsocnodes Gebien, 1920
