= Vieta =

Vieta may refer to:

- François Viète (1540–1603), commonly known as Franciscus Vieta, French mathematician
- Vieta (crater), a crater on the Moon, named after him
- Vieta's formulas, expressing the coefficients of a polynomial as signed sums and products of its roots
- Artūras Vieta (born 1961), Lithuanian sprint canoer
- Eduard Vieta, Spanish psychiatrist
- Vieta (beetle), a genus of beetles in the subtribe Sepidiina
