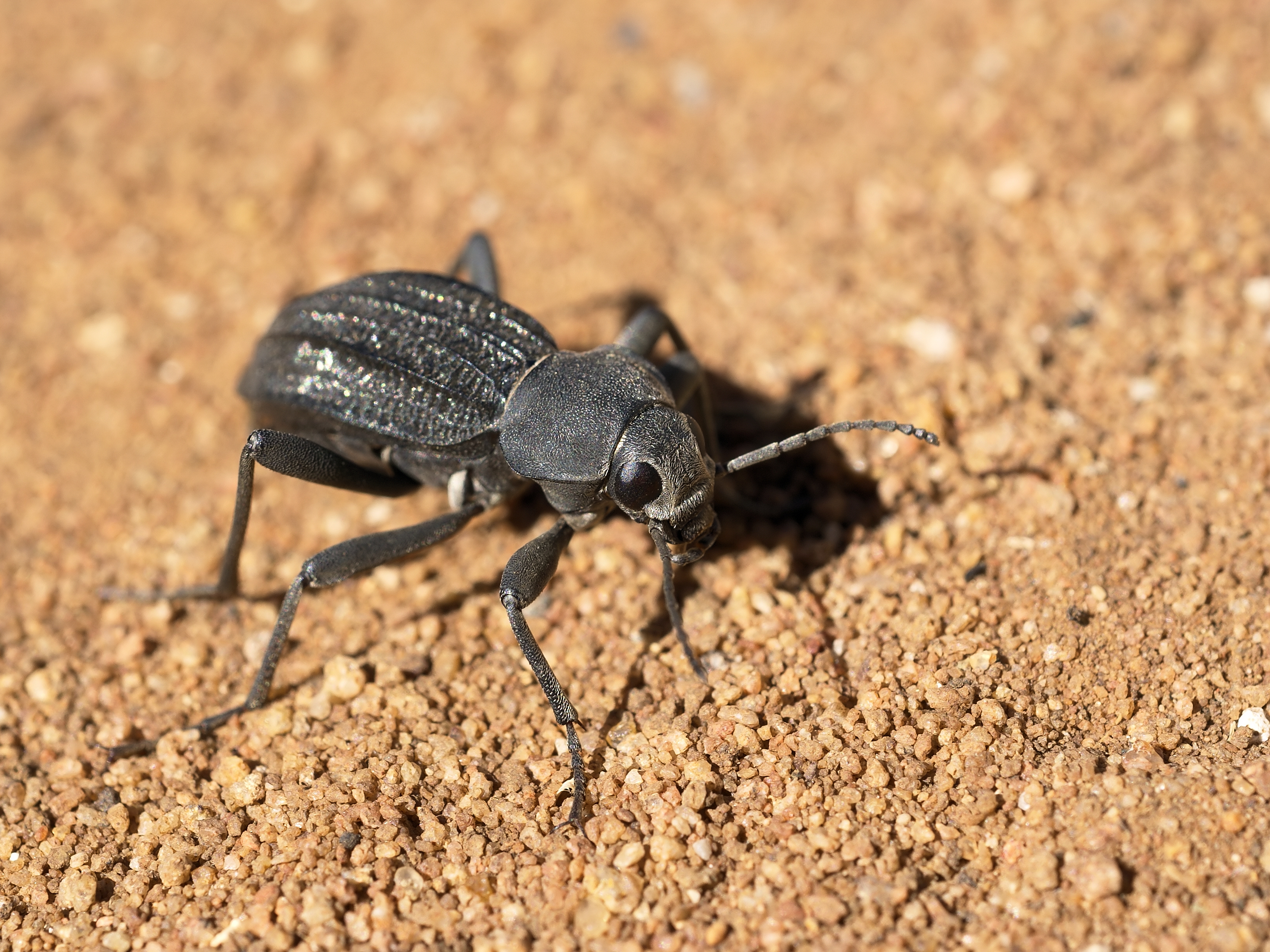
- Somaticus aeneus

Scientific classification
- Kingdom: Animalia
- Phylum: Arthropoda
- Class: Insecta
- Order: Coleoptera
- Suborder: Polyphaga
- Infraorder: Cucujiformia
- Family: Tenebrionidae
- Subfamily: Pimeliinae
- Tribe: Sepidiini
- Subtribe: Trachynotina; Koch, 1955

Type genus
- Trachynotus Latreille, 1828

= Trachynotina =

Subtribe of beetles

Trachynotina is a subtribe of darkling beetles in the family Tenebrionidae. There are about 10 genera and more than 170 described species in Trachynotina, found in southern Africa. Although Sepidiini species attract the attention of enthusiasts due to their outstanding morphology and behaviour, the group lacks comprehensive revisions at all taxonomic levels.

== Genera ==
These 10 genera belong to the subtribe Trachynotina:

- Cyrtoderes Dejean, 1834
- Epairopsis Koch, 1955
- Ethmus Haag-Rutenberg-Rutenberg, 1873
- Histrionotus Koch, 1955
- Microphligra Koch, 1955
- Ossiporis Pascoe, 1866
- Oxycerus Koch, 1955
- Somaticus Hope, 1840
- Trachynotus Latreille, 1828
- Trichethmus Gebien, 1937
