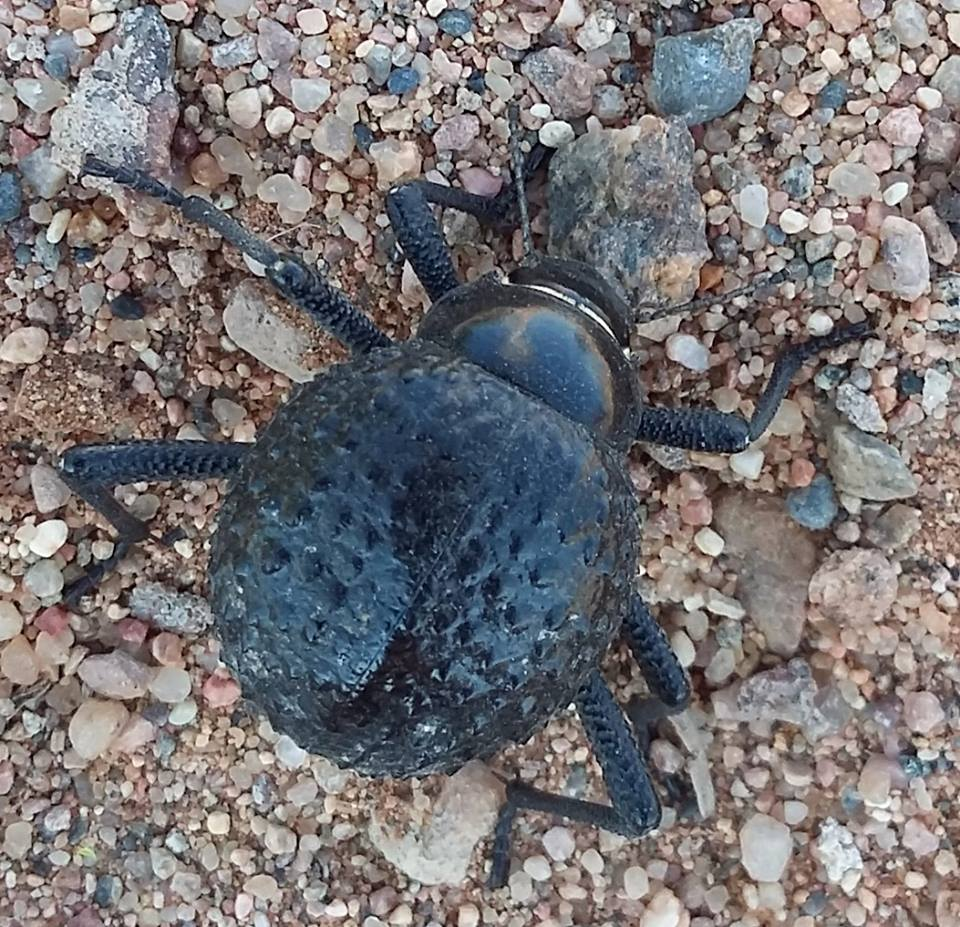

Scientific classification
- Kingdom: Animalia
- Phylum: Arthropoda
- Class: Insecta
- Order: Coleoptera
- Suborder: Polyphaga
- Infraorder: Cucujiformia
- Family: Tenebrionidae
- Genus: Physosterna; Allard, 1885
- Species: P. cribripes

Binomial name
- Physosterna cribripes (Haag-Rutenberg, 1875)

Synonyms
- Adesmia cribripes Haag-Rutenberg, 1875; Adesmia tuberculipennis Haag-Rutenberg, 1875

= Physosterna cribripes =

Species of beetle

Physosterna cribripes, the desert toktokkie or woestyntoktokkie, is a flightless species of desert-dwelling darkling beetle or Tenebrionid found along the West coast of Namibia and Angola. This species has a body length of some 18.4 mm (0.72 in) and a mass of 402 mg (6.20 gr).

Although the family name of Tenebrionidae implies a group preferring dark places, a large number of species from this family, such as this one, are diurnal. In the heat of summer it is active from 9-10 am and again at 4-6 pm, and seeks out well-shaded microhabitats during extreme heat. It is usually found in washes, on gravel plains and in rocky places, often climbing vegetation to feed.

Most darkling species are omnivores, both as adults and larvae, feeding on the detritus of fresh and decaying plant matter, dead insects, and fungi. Larvae are nocturnal, fossorial, and heavily armoured. Several Namibian Tenebrionids, such as Onymacris unguicularis and Onymacris bicolor, have evolved a specialised surface on their elytra, forming minute droplets from the fog which regularly occurs along the coast. Droplets condense by virtue of alternating hydrophobic, wax-coated and hydrophilic, non-waxy regions. When the beetle adopts a head-down stance facing into the fog-laden wind, condensed water drains towards its mouthparts where it is swallowed. Studies on the population density of dune beetles in the Namib Desert have shown that the fog-collecting beetles' numbers are not diminished by periods of low rainfall, whereas other Tenebrionids decline dramatically. The microstructure of the elytra has been copied by cancer researchers so as to control 'spheroid sizes of therapeutic islet cells and mesenchymal stem cells'.

== Etymology ==
'Physosterna' - swollen or bladder-like sterna
'cribripes' - perforated or sieve-like foot

== See also ==
- Onymacris unguicularis, another fog-basking Namib desert beetle
- Stenocara gracilipes, another fog-basking Namib desert beetle
