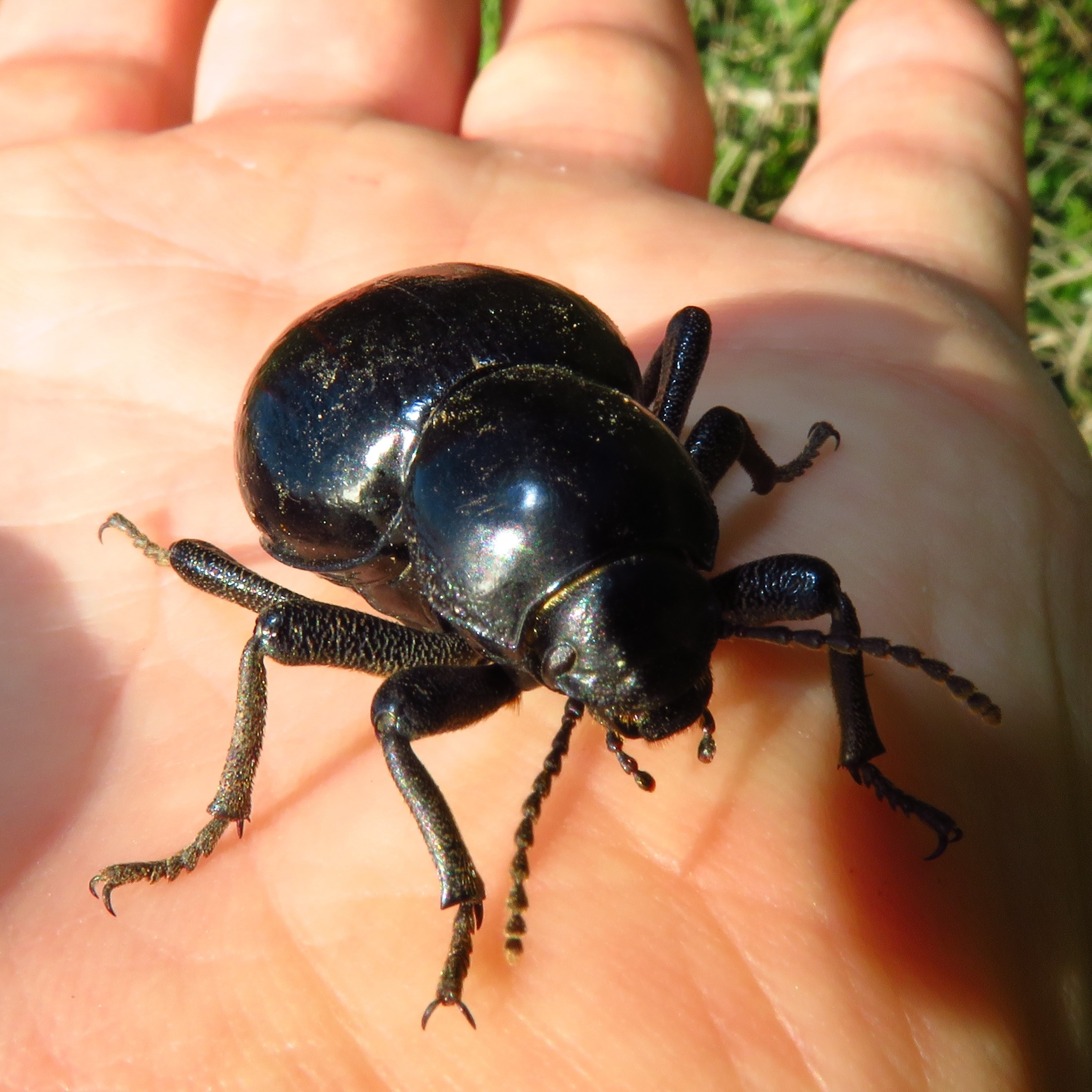
- Toktokkie beetle (Mariazofia spp.) in Signal Hill, Cape Town, South Africa

Scientific classification
- Kingdom: Animalia
- Phylum: Arthropoda
- Class: Insecta
- Order: Coleoptera
- Suborder: Polyphaga
- Infraorder: Cucujiformia
- Family: Tenebrionidae
- Subtribe: Molurina
- Genus: Mariazofia; Kamiński, 2022

= Mariazofia =

Genus of beetles

Mariazofia is a genus of ground-dwelling Afrotropical beetles in the family Tenebrionidae. They are among the largest of the darkling beetles. Like other genera within subtribe Molurina, adults of this genus engage in a behavior known as "substrate tapping", a form of sexual communication in which they produce vibrations by tapping their abdomen rhythmically on the ground to attract mates. Their common name, "tok-tok beetle" or "toktokkie beetle", is based on this behavior.

== Etymology ==
The name of this genus —Mariazofia— is a portmanteau of the names of the daughters (Maria and Zofia) of the first author of the paper in which it is first described.

== Description ==
Mariazofia is black or dark rufous in color and stout in shape, and average about 2.6 centimetres (1.0 in) in body length. It is similar in appearance to Moluris, having confined patches of bristles on the abdomen in males, as well as a similar structure of the female abdominal terminalia. Mariazofia can be distinguished from Moluris because the head is prognathous in the case of Mariazofia, while it is hypognathous in Moluris. Also the pronotal disc is nonconvex in the case of Mariazofia, while it is convex in Moluris.

== Distribution and habitat ==
These beetles are widely distributed throughout Southern Africa in various habitats, ranging from coastal forests to hills, woodlands, and deserts.

== Species ==
A detailed cladistic analysis of specimens within the tribe Sepidiini was recently completed, based on certain anatomic features of female specimens (e.g., ovipositor, genital tubes, spiculum ventrale and proctiger). This analysis has resulted in a major revision of the taxonomic classification within this tribe, including the description of several novel taxa. Among these is Mariazofia, first described in 2022 by Kamiński, et al. Most of the species within this new genus were previously classified within genus Psammodes. As of late 2022, the genus contains 141 species, including:

- Mariazofia algoensis (Péringuey)
- Mariazofia asperulipennis (Fairmaire)
- Mariazofia atrata (Haag-Rutenberg)
- Mariazofia barbata (Fåhreus)
- Mariazofia basuto (Koch)
- Mariazofia batesi (Haag-Rutenberg, 1871) (southern Africa)
- Mariazofia bennigseni (Kraatz)
- Mariazofia brunnipes (Haag-Rutenberg)
- Mariazofia caelata (Péringuey)
- Mariazofia caffra (Fåhraeus)
- Mariazofia caraboides (Haag-Rutenberg)
- Mariazofia carinata (Haag-Rutenberg)
- Mariazofia clara (Haag-Rutenberg)
- Mariazofia collaris (Haag-Rutenberg)
- Mariazofia colorata (Haag-Rutenberg)
- Mariazofia comata (Haag-Rutenberg)
- Mariazofia convexa (Solier)
- Mariazofia coriacea (Gerstaecker)
- Mariazofia costalis (Haag-Rutenberg)
- Mariazofia dejeani (Solier)
- Mariazofia depressicollis (Haag-Rutenberg)
- Mariazofia devexa (Fåhraeus)
- Mariazofia difficilis (Haag-Rutenberg)
- Mariazofia diluta (Haag-Rutenberg)
- Mariazofia dimidiata (Haag-Rutenberg)
- Mariazofia dohrni (Haag-Rutenberg)
- Mariazofia eberlanzi (Koch)
- Mariazofia ethologa (Koch)
- Mariazofia expleta (Quedenfeldt)
- Mariazofia farta (Péringuey, 1904) (South Africa)
- Mariazofia ferruginea (Haag-Rutenberg)
- Mariazofia flagrans (Péringuey)
- Mariazofia fragilis (Haag-Rutenberg)
- Mariazofia fritschi (Haag-Rutenberg)
- Mariazofia funesta (Haag-Rutenberg)
- Mariazofia gariesa (Péringuey)
- Mariazofia gibba coelata (Solier)
- Mariazofia gibba gibba (Linnaeus)
- Mariazofia gibba gravida (Solier)
- Mariazofia gibba hemisphaerica (Solier)
- Mariazofia gibba nigrocostata (Haag-Rutenberg)
- Mariazofia gibba solieri (Gebien)
- Mariazofia gibba unicolor (Fabricius)
- Mariazofia glabra (Koch)
- Mariazofia glabrata biena (Koch)
- Mariazofia glabrata glabrata (Harold)
- Mariazofia grandis (Solier, 1843)
- Mariazofia granulata (Solier)
- Mariazofia granulifer (Haag-Rutenberg)
- Mariazofia guillarmodi (Koch)
- Mariazofia haagi (Gebien)
- Mariazofia herero (Péringuey)
- Mariazofia hirtipennis (Haag-Rutenberg)
- Mariazofia hirtipes Laporte de Castelnau, 1840)
- Mariazofia hirta (Bertoloni)
- Mariazofia hottentottus (Péringuey)
- Mariazofia incongruens (Péringuey)
- Mariazofia infernalis (Harold)
- Mariazofia intermedia (Péringuey)
- Mariazofia janitor (Koch)
- Mariazofia kamagasa (Péringuey)
- Mariazofia kirschi (Haag-Rutenberg)
- Mariazofia kubub (Péringuey)
- Mariazofia kuisip (Péringuey, 1908) (Namibia)
- Mariazofia laevicollis (Solier)
- Mariazofia lanuginosa (Haag-Rutenberg)
- Mariazofia lethargica (Péringuey)
- Mariazofia memnonia (Haag-Rutenberg)
- Mariazofia mimipinguis (Koch)
- Mariazofia moschleri (Haag-Rutenberg)
- Mariazofia muata (Harold)
- Mariazofia nigrisaxicola (Koch)
- Mariazofia nitens (Fåhraeus)
- Mariazofia nitidicollis (Haag-Rutenberg)
- Mariazofia nitidipennis (Fairmaire)
- Mariazofia nitidissima (Haag-Rutenberg)
- Mariazofia obsulcata (Haag-Rutenberg)
- Mariazofia ovata (Solier)
- Mariazofia ovipennis (Haag-Rutenberg)
- Mariazofia perfida (Péringuey)
- Mariazofia picea (Haag-Rutenberg)
- Mariazofia pilifer (Haag-Rutenberg)
- Mariazofia pilosella (Haag-Rutenberg)
- Mariazofia pilosipennis (Haag-Rutenberg)
- Mariazofia pilosa Thunberg, 1787) (Namibia)
- Mariazofia pinguis (Solier)
- Mariazofia plicata (Solier)
- Mariazofia plicipennis (Gemminger)
- Mariazofia ponderosa Fåhreus, 1870) (South Africa)
- Mariazofia procera (Fåhraeus)
- Mariazofia procustes (Westwood)
- Mariazofia profana (Péringuey)
- Mariazofia propinqua (Quedenfeldt)
- Mariazofia protensa (Haag-Rutenberg)
- Mariazofia pubescens (Solier)
- Mariazofia pustulifer (Haag-Rutenberg)
- Mariazofia quadricostata (Fåhraeus)
- Mariazofia rauca (Haag-Rutenberg)
- Mariazofia refleximargo (Gebien)
- Mariazofia retrospinosa (Haag-Rutenberg)
- Mariazofia rotundicollis (Haag-Rutenberg)
- Mariazofia rufofasciata (Haag-Rutenberg)
- Mariazofia rufonervosa (Haag-Rutenberg)
- Mariazofia rufostriata (Haag-Rutenberg)
- Mariazofia rugulosipennis (Haag-Rutenberg)
- Mariazofia rugulosa (Solier)
- Mariazofia rustica (Péringuey)
- Mariazofia scabrata gariepina (Koch)
- Mariazofia scabrata scabrata (Solier, 1843) (South Africa)
- Mariazofia scabriuscula (Haag-Rutenberg)
- Mariazofia segnis (Haag-Rutenberg)
- Mariazofia semipilosa (Haag-Rutenberg)
- Mariazofia semivillosa (Haag-Rutenberg)
- Mariazofia solitaria (Péringuey)
- Mariazofia spiculosa (Haag-Rutenberg)
- Mariazofia splendens (Haag-Rutenberg)
- Mariazofia steinhelli (Haag-Rutenberg)
- Mariazofia striatopilosa (Haag-Rutenberg)
- Mariazofia subaenea (Harold)
- Mariazofia subcostata (Solier)
- Mariazofia subgranulata (Haag-Rutenberg)
- Mariazofia tenuipes (Fåhraeus)
- Mariazofia timarchoides (Haag-Rutenberg)
- Mariazofia togatus (Koch)
- Mariazofia tomentosus (Solier)
- Mariazofia trachysceloides (Haag-Rutenberg)
- Mariazofia transvaalensis (Haag-Rutenberg)
- Mariazofia tricostata (Fåhraeus)
- Mariazofia tumidipennis (Haag-Rutenberg)
- Mariazofia undulata (Haag-Rutenberg)
- Mariazofia uniformis litoralis (Koch)
- Mariazofia uniformis rugigaster (Koch)
- Mariazofia uniformis uniformis (Haag-Rutenberg)
- Mariazofia valida (Kratz)
- Mariazofia velutina (Haag-Rutenberg)
- Mariazofia ventricosa Fåhreus, 1870)
- Mariazofia villosostriata (Haag-Rutenberg)
- Mariazofia villosula (Haag-Rutenberg)
- Mariazofia vittata (Solier)
- Mariazofia volvula (Haag-Rutenberg)
- Mariazofia zschokkei (Koch)
