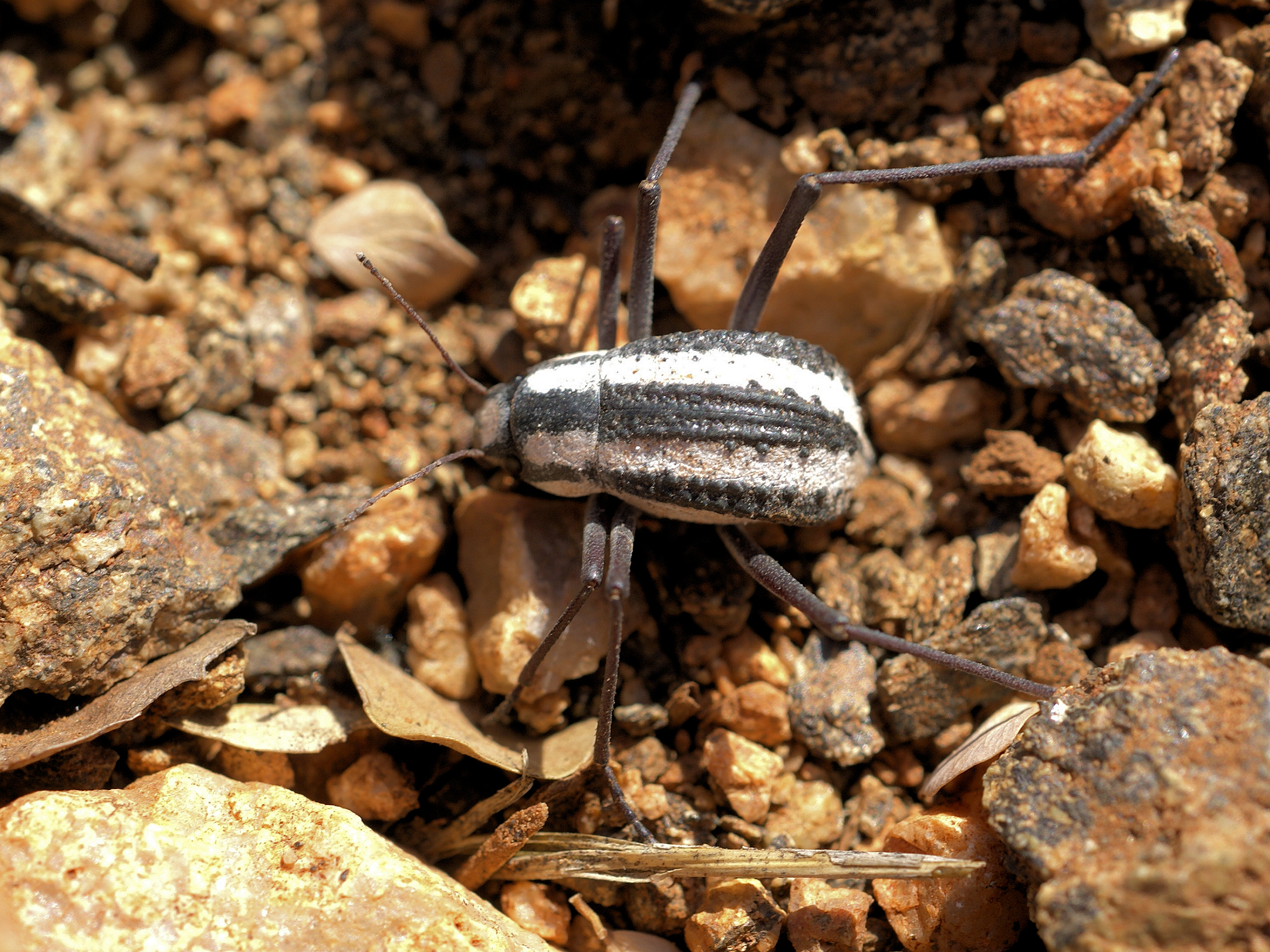

Scientific classification
- Kingdom: Animalia
- Phylum: Arthropoda
- Class: Insecta
- Order: Coleoptera
- Suborder: Polyphaga
- Infraorder: Cucujiformia
- Family: Tenebrionidae
- Genus: Stenocara
- Species: S. gracilipes

Binomial name
- Stenocara gracilipes Solier, 1835

= Stenocara gracilipes =

Species of beetle

Stenocara gracilipes, the racingstripe darkling beetle, is a species of beetle that is native to the Namib Desert in southern Africa. This is one of the most arid areas of the world, receiving only 1.4 centimetres (0.55 in) of rain per year. The beetle is able to survive by collecting water on its bumpy back surface from early morning fogs.

To drink water, the S. gracilipes stands on a small ridge of sand using its long, spindly legs. Facing into the breeze, with its body angled at 45°, the beetle catches fog droplets on its hardened wings, or elytra. Its head faces upwind, and its stiff, bumpy elytra are spread against the damp breeze. Minute water droplets (15-20 μm in diameter) from the fog gather on its wings; there the droplets stick to hydrophilic bumps, which are surrounded by waxy, hydrophobic troughs. Droplets flatten as they make contact with the hydrophilic surfaces, preventing them from being blown by wind and providing a surface for other droplets to attach. Accumulation continues until the combined droplet weight overcomes the water's electrostatic attraction to the bumps as well as any opposing force of the wind; in a 30 km/h breeze, such a droplet would stick to the wing until it grows to roughly 5 mm in diameter; at that point it will roll down the beetle's back to its mouthparts.

Researchers at the Massachusetts Institute of Technology have emulated this capability by creating a textured surface that combines alternating hydrophobic and hydrophilic materials. Potential uses include extracting moisture from the air and creating fog-free windows and mirrors. A company called NBD Nano is attempting to commercialize the technology.

In 2014, it was shown that these beetles may also obtain water from dew (i.e. from humid air without fog).

== See also ==
- Onymacris unguicularis, another fog-basking Namib desert beetle
- Physosterna cribripes, another fog-basking Namib desert beetle
