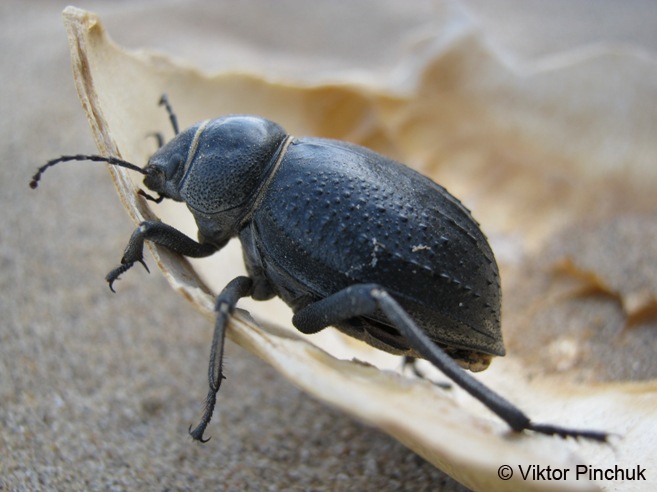

Scientific classification
- Kingdom: Animalia
- Phylum: Arthropoda
- Clade: Pancrustacea
- Class: Insecta
- Order: Coleoptera
- Suborder: Polyphaga
- Infraorder: Cucujiformia
- Family: Tenebrionidae
- Genus: Onymacris
- Species: O. unguicularis

Binomial name
- Onymacris unguicularis Haag, 1875

= Onymacris unguicularis =

Species of beetle

Onymacris unguicularis, also known commonly as the fog-basking beetle, head-stander beetle, or the Toktokkies, is a species of darkling beetle that is native to the Namib Desert of southwestern Africa. At night, during foggy weather, these beetles climb sand dunes and stand on their forelegs in order to capture water droplets as they run down their vertical bodies and into their mouths The behaviour is called "fog-basking" and is unique to Onymacris unguicularis and Onymacris bicolor.

Fog basking was first observed in the O. unguicularis in 1976. The mechanism for this ability is still being discovered, but current research points towards the beetle's elytra containing some hydrophobic component that can catch water droplets being blown in the wind. The idea of harvesting atmospheric moisture from early morning dew using special materials has been widely utilized in many parts of the world.

This species has very often been confused with Stenocara gracilipes, another species of darkling beetle in the Namib Desert, due to their similar coloration and water capturing behaviour.

== Geographic range ==
Onymacris unguicularis inhabits most of the Namib Desert and it is almost entirely restricted to this habitat. The species is confined to the major dune fields within the northern (Cunene, Skeleton Coast) and southern (Namib) sand seas of the desert. The species' migratory habits correlate very highly with the observed pattern for common fog occurrence in the region.

== Habitat ==
The coastal regions of the Namib Desert serve as the natural habitat of Onymacris unguicularis. The long and narrow desert hugs the southwestern coast of Africa, displaying a subtropical climate. Due to cold water currents, the desert is extremely arid. The Namib Desert annually receives less than 50 mm of rainfall overall and in its western half between 0 and 12 mm. Humidity is low most of the year outside of fog events, with relative humidity daily dropping below 50%, with recorded lows below 20%. A majority of the moisture is brought in by fogs blowing from the ocean, bringing water droplets that condensate across the environment. The phenomenon causes a gradient between "coastal" and "inland" faunas across the region as humidity decreases and temperature increases further inland.

== Appearance ==
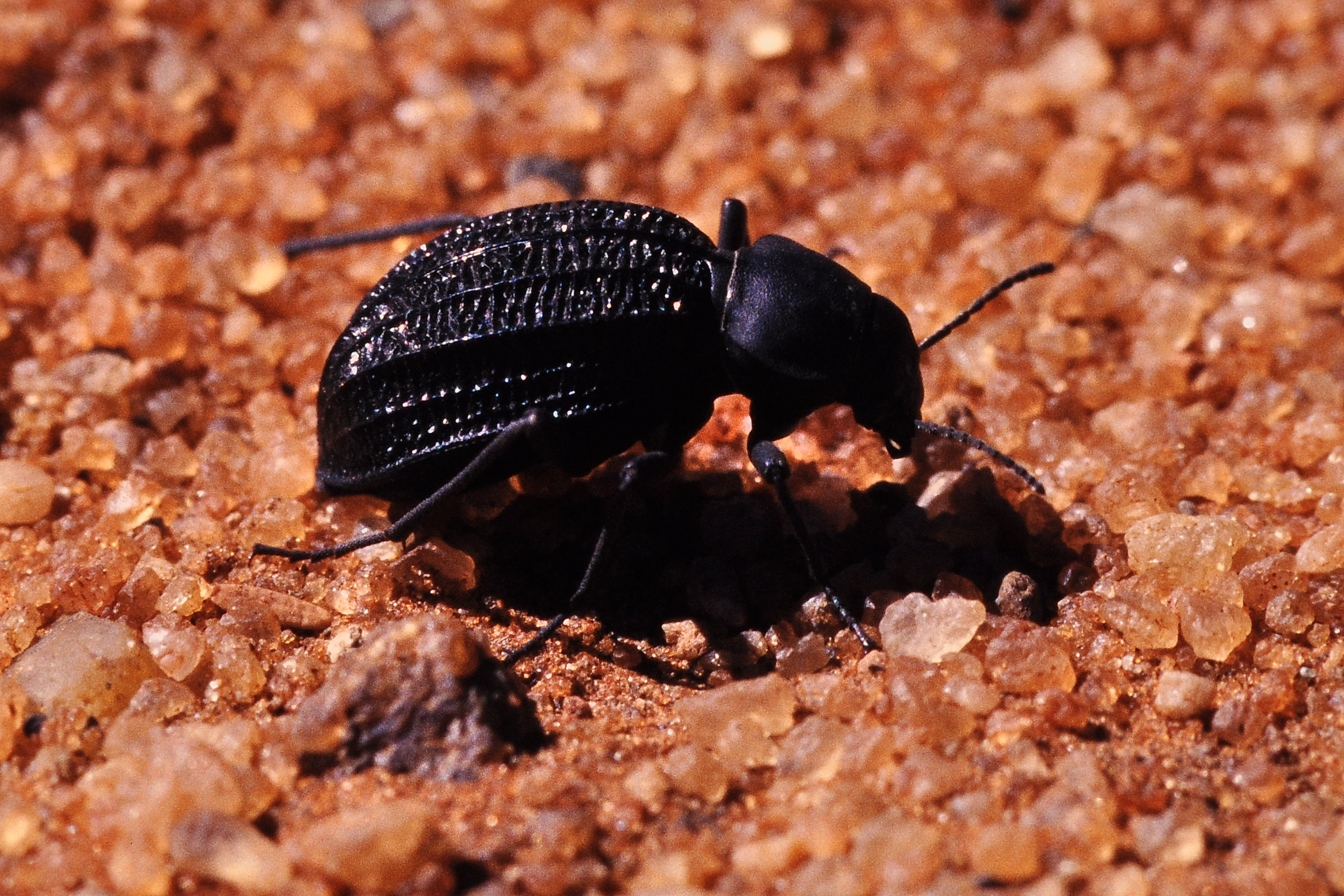
Onymacris unguicularis

Onymacris unguicularis is a fully black beetle, with a fused elytra and no wings. The elytra are almost completely smooth, except for the back half which has large distinct grooves. These grooves are approximately 0.5 mm wide and are divided by narrow ridges. Males have longer legs compared to females, as well as setose brushes on the anterior femora. Females tend to have wider elytra than their male counterparts. There are differences between the two subspecies, with the northern Onymacris unguicularis schulzeae having shorter elytra when compared to the southern Onymacris unguicularis unguicularis. There are also notable differences in pronotal and prosternal shape.

== Behaviour ==
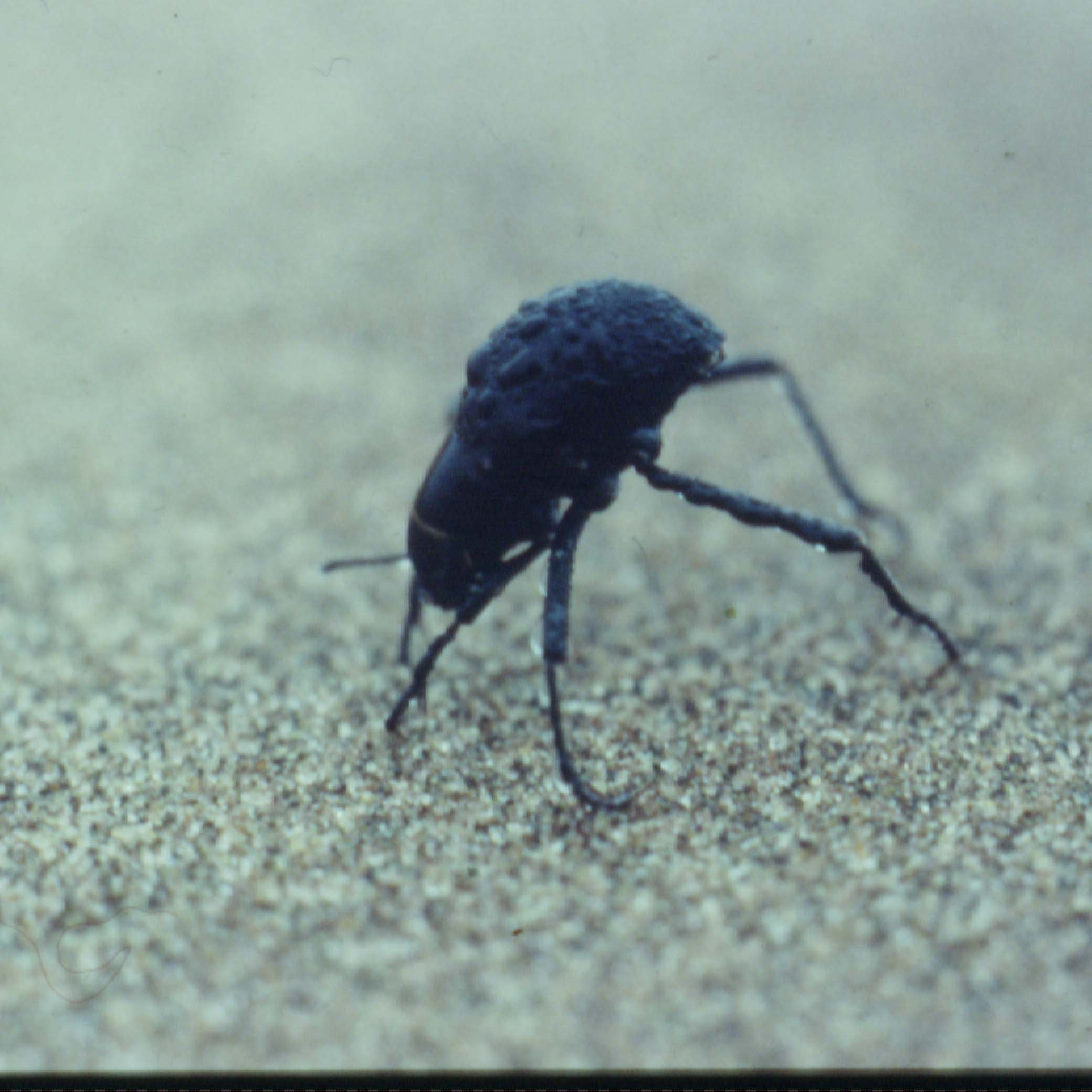
Onymacris unguicularis in headstand position

=== Fog-basking behaviour ===
One of the most distinguishing features of Onymacris unguicularis is its fog-basking behaviour. This behaviour is believed to have evolved independently in only two Tenebrionidae beetles, O. unguicularis and Onymacris bicolor O. unguicularis is normally active during the daytime and buries itself in sand dunes when night sets in. During periods of nocturnal fog in the desert, however, they will emerge from the sand and climb onto the slip face of a dune (the side of the sand dune not directly hit by the wind). Positioning themselves against the wind, they conduct a "headstand" posture, angling their heads toward the ground and lifting their dorsal side towards the wind. The angle from resting was observed to be 23 degrees from horizontal. In this handstand position, fog water condenses on the surface of the beetle's elytra and runs down their body into their mouth. The amount of water that can be collected by an individual beetle relative to their weight can vary greatly, with some beetles gaining little to no water while others have been recorded taking in 34% of their total body weight.

The "headstand" posture is caused by high humidity caused by fog conditions. Low temperatures, observed to be below 20 degrees Celsius during nocturnal fog, may play a role in modulating the behaviour, but low temperatures do not seem to be capable of triggering the "headstand" posture without high humidity conditions.

==== Mechanism ====
The mechanism for water collection is still debated, but theories have been placed as to how Onymacris unguicularis collects fog water on its elytra. One theory posited for another darkling beetle, Stenocara gracilipes, claims that bumps on the elytra of the beetle function as hydrophilic peaks where water from the fog gathers into droplets before becoming heavy enough to roll off the peak and slide down the smooth hydrophobic regions between peaks and into the beetle's mouth. The theoretical mechanism, however, has some issues when applied to O. unguicularis. The mechanism requires bumpy elytra for the presence of hydrophilic peaks. O. unguicularis's elytra is relatively smooth in its entirety, except for the back half which is compressed of grooves and ridges. While these aspects of O. unguicularis's elytra could have functioned in a manner similar to the theoretical mechanism, hydrophilic regions on the beetle's elytra were unable to be conclusively found. Another theory posits that O. unguicularis's smooth elytra is entirely hydrophobic, with no hydrophilic regions. The presence of hydrophobic regions on the elytra has been proven. A limitation that has plagued the ability to confirm any hydrophilic regions has been that most research has investigated the elytral properties of dead beetles. A live beetles may cause the surface properties of their elytra to change depending on the fog conditions.

===== Function =====
Fog-basking is clearly an adaptation for obtaining water, but research has shown that it is the primary source of water intake for Onymacris unguicularis. Moisture obtained from foraging detritus during the daytime is insufficient to maintain maximum foraging activity or egg production. Thus, fog-basking is a method that ensures that the beetle is capable of obtaining enough water to maintain an effective water balance that allows for daytime activity even in hot desert temperatures. The water obtained through fog-basking also seems to play a key role in O. unguicularis's osmoregulation.

== Physiology ==
=== Thermoregulation ===
Onymacris unguicularis is able to regulate its body heat at temperatures much lower than those experienced during normal daytime activity. O. unguicularis's body temperature has been recorded to be between 32-38 degrees Celsius. During fog-basking activity, however, temperatures are much lower, falling as low as one degree Celsius. It has been shown that the beetle employs large amounts of glycerol and trehalose in its hemolymph, relative to other similar daytime-active beetles. These compounds are notable in nature for their antifreeze properties. It is understood that the presence of these compounds allows for O. unguicularis to counteract freezing during this fog-basking activity.

== Mating ==
=== Female/male interactions ===
==== Copulation ====
In the events leading to copulation, male Onymacris unguicularis beetles will mount stationary or moving females and remain on top for extended periods of time. Forelegs and middle legs are primarily used to stay clung to the female while hindlegs are left limp and are mostly allowed to drag along. Females may attempt to throw off the mating male, but most efforts are unsuccessful. The whole copulation process may take anywhere from one to ten minutes. Males directly transfer a spermatophore into the female through the insertion of a penile tube extending from the aedeagus into the bursa copulatrix of the female.

===== Sperm competition =====
Female Onymacris unguicularis are known to practice a polyandrous mating system. If the female's initial sperm supply has not been completely used for fertilizing her eggs before she mates with another male, there is sperm competition. The phenomenon is fairly common in female O. unguicularis, with the average number of matings for a female being three times in 35 days. Aspects of sperm competition such as sperm displacement and sperm precedence have been observed in the species. In terms of the former, during copulation, the newly inserted spermatophore will push the old spermatophore out of the female's body and into the sand. The old spermatophore, once ejected, appears as a bleb, consisting of the remains of the old spermatophore sac and coiled penile from the last male. The latter phenomenon has been observed through experiments that use sterile male technique, indicating that not all old sperm is displaced during a new mating. In these experiments, females are allowed to mate with fertile males initially and lay eggs before the males are replaced with irradiated sterile males to do the same. The fertility rate between the fertile males and sterile males has shown substantial decrease in fertility rate, showing that the sterile sperm was unable to completely dislodge all of the former sperm. These observations indicate a possible mechanism involved in the long-term storage and maintenance of sperm.

== Subspecies ==
Subspecies of Onymacris unguicularis include the following:

- Onymacris unguicularis schulzeae
  - A northern subspecies that occupy Cunene and Skeleton Coast sand dunes
- Onymacris unguicularis unguicularis
  - A southern subspecies that occupy Namib sand dunes
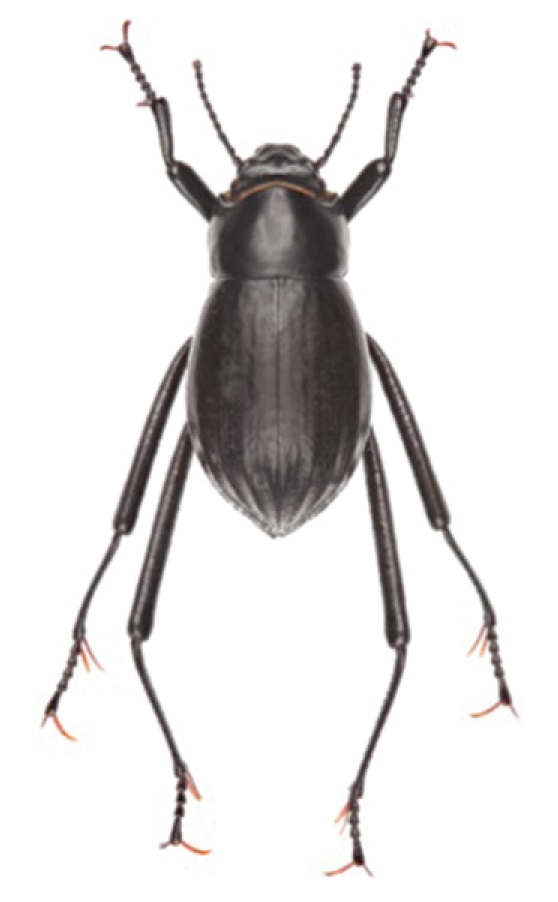
Onymacris unguicularis unguicularis

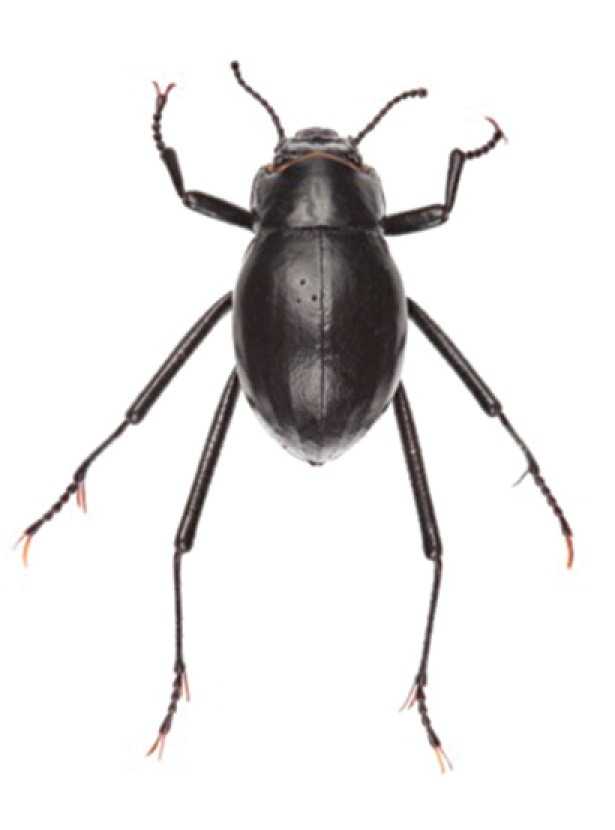
Onymacris unguicularis schulzeae

== Confusion with Stenocara gracilipes ==
Due to the large variety of darkling beetle species in the Namib Desert, different beetles from the region have been confused with each other. Such is the case with Onymacris unguicularis and Stenocara gracilipes, which in non-scientific literature have both been called the "fog-basking beetle." The confusion seems to originate from a paper detailing a mechanism for S. gracilipes's ability to capture water using hydrophilic bumps and hydrophobic troughs on the beetle's elytra during fog-basking. Debate ensued as the only known beetles to display fog-basking behaviour were O. unguicularis and Onymacris bicolor. In a notable response, the notion of S. gracilipes's fog-basking behaviour was challenged, and the photograph of S. gracilipes that was used in the original study was stated to have been misidentified, being a photo of another beetle, Physosterna cribripes. Additionally, it was noted that the tilting posture being identified as "fog-basking" was most likely a common alarm response found in many species of the Tenebrionidae family. A later experiment would test the fog-basking behaviour and water-collecting efficiency between four Tenebrionidae beetles: O. unguicularis, Onymacris laeviceps, S. gracilipes and P. cribripes. Notably, only O. unguicularis displayed the behaviour. The study supported many of the points made in the response such as re-identifying the beetle as P. cribripes according to their own observations and noting no fog-basking behaviour in S. gracilipes.
