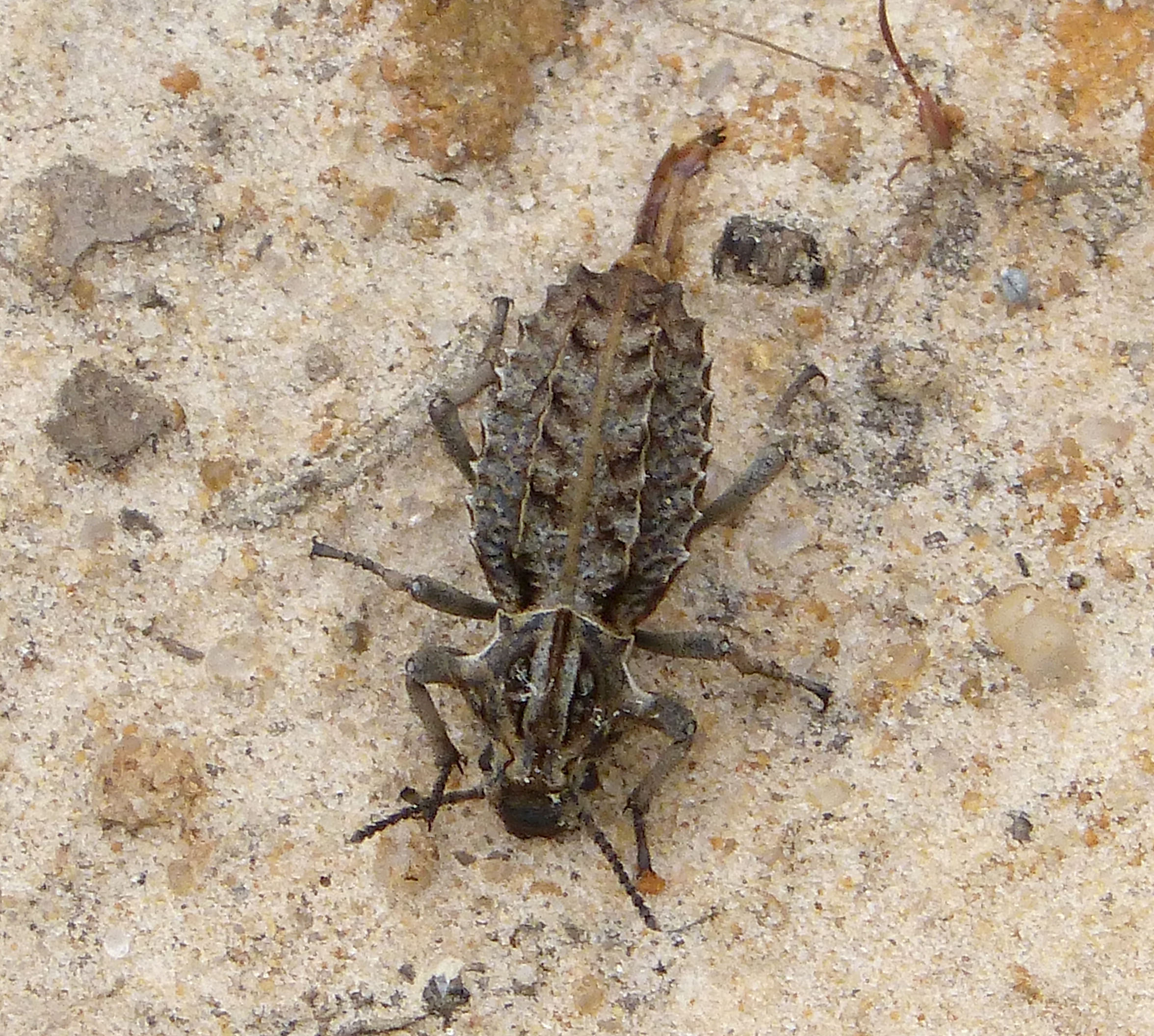
- Sepidium bidentatum

Scientific classification
- Domain: Eukaryota
- Kingdom: Animalia
- Phylum: Arthropoda
- Class: Insecta
- Order: Coleoptera
- Suborder: Polyphaga
- Infraorder: Cucujiformia
- Family: Tenebrionidae
- Subfamily: Pimeliinae
- Tribe: Sepidiini
- Subtribe: Sepidiina; Eschscholtz, 1829

Type genus
- Sepidium Fabricius, 1775

= Sepidiina =

Subtribe of beetles

Sepidiina is a subtribe of darkling beetles in the family Tenebrionidae. There are about 8 genera and more than 110 described species in Sepidiina, found widely distributed in the Mediterranean area and Sub-Saharan Africa. Most species were described from the Horn of Africa.

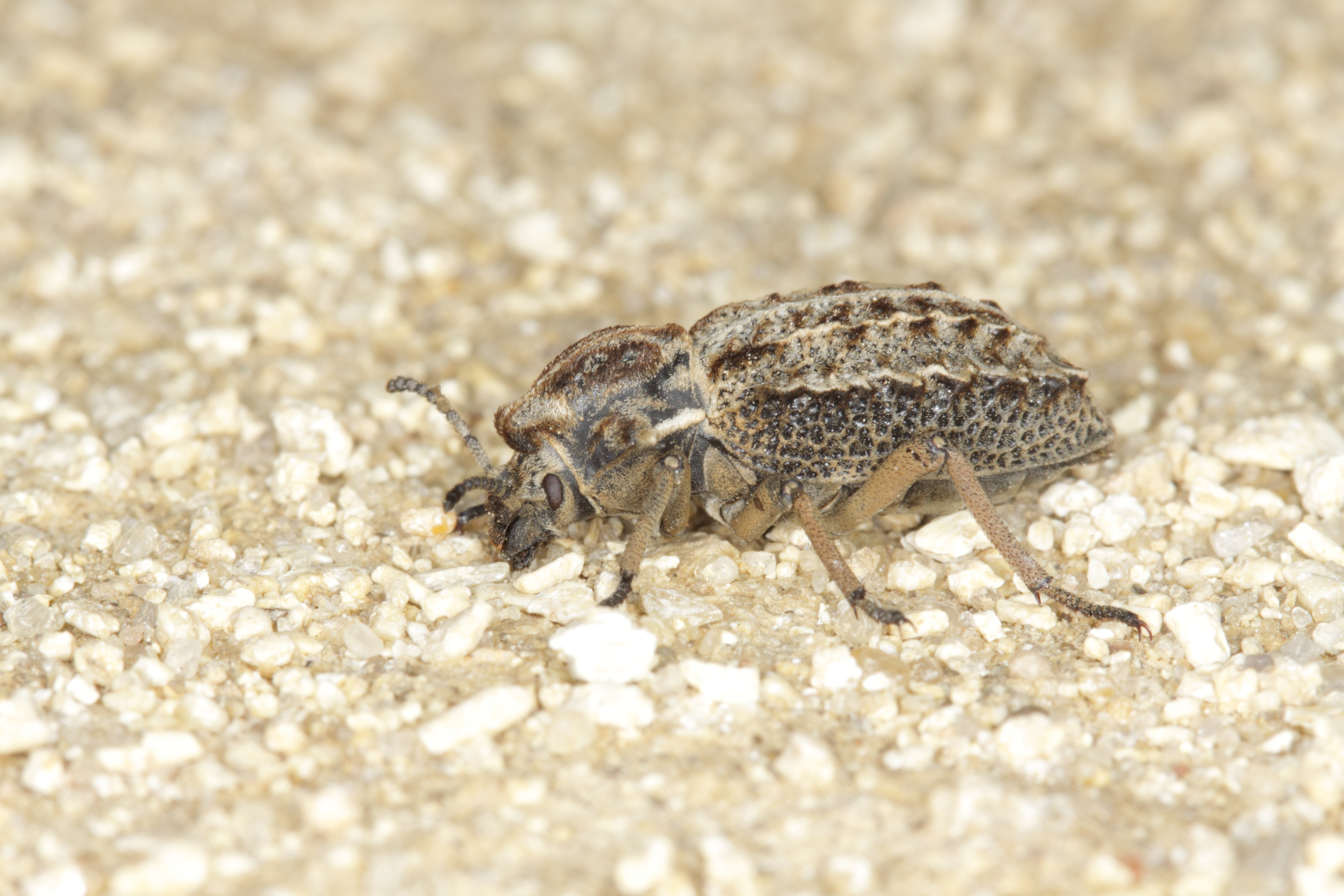
Sepidium bidentatum

== Genera ==
These eight genera belong to the subtribe Sepidiina:

- Dimoniacis Koch, 1958
- Echinotus Solier, 1843
- Peringueyia Koch, 1958
- Sepidiopsis Gestro, 1892
- Sepidiostenus Fairmaire, 1884
- Sepidium Fabricius, 1775
- Vieta Laporte, 1840
- Vietomorpha Fairmaire, 1887
