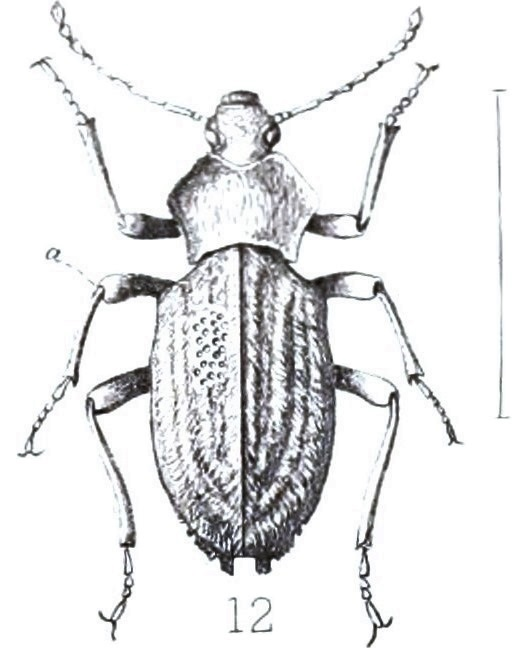
- Hypomelus flagrans

Scientific classification
- Domain: Eukaryota
- Kingdom: Animalia
- Phylum: Arthropoda
- Class: Insecta
- Order: Coleoptera
- Suborder: Polyphaga
- Infraorder: Cucujiformia
- Family: Tenebrionidae
- Subfamily: Pimeliinae
- Tribe: Sepidiini
- Subtribe: Hypomelina; Koch, 1955

Type genus
- Hypomelus Solier, 1843

= Hypomelina =

Subtribe of beetles

Hypomelina is a subtribe of darkling beetles in the family Tenebrionidae. There are about 9 genera and more than 40 described species in Hypomelina, found mainly in southern Africa. The majority of species were described from the Namibian coast, and only the genus Bombocnodulus is found as far north as central Africa.

== Genera ==
These nine genera belong to the subtribe Hypomelina:

- Argenticrinis Louw, 1979
- Bombocnodulus Koch, 1955
- Brinckia Koch, 1962
- Hypomelus Solier, 1843
- Iugidorsum Louw, 1979
- Sulcipectus Louw, 1979
- Trachynotidus Péringuey, 1899
- Triangulipenna Louw, 1979
- Uniungulum Koch, 1962
