= Oxurina =

Scientific classification
- Domain: Eukaryota
- Kingdom: Animalia
- Phylum: Arthropoda
- Class: Insecta
- Order: Coleoptera
- Suborder: Polyphaga
- Infraorder: Cucujiformia
- Family: Tenebrionidae
- Subfamily: Pimeliinae
- Tribe: Sepidiini
- Subtribe: Oxurina; Koch, 1955

Type genus
- Oxura Kirby, 1819

Subtribe of beetles

Oxurina is a subtribe of darkling beetles in the family Tenebrionidae. There are about 8 genera and more than 50 described species in Oxurina, found in southern and central Africa.

== Genera ==
These eight genera belong to the subtribe Oxurina:

- Decoriplus Louw, 1979
- Miripronotum Louw, 1979
- Namibomodes Koch, 1952
- Oxura Kirby, 1819
- Palpomodes Koch, 1952
- Pterostichula Koch, 1952
- Stenethmus Gebien, 1937
- Synhimba Koch, 1952
