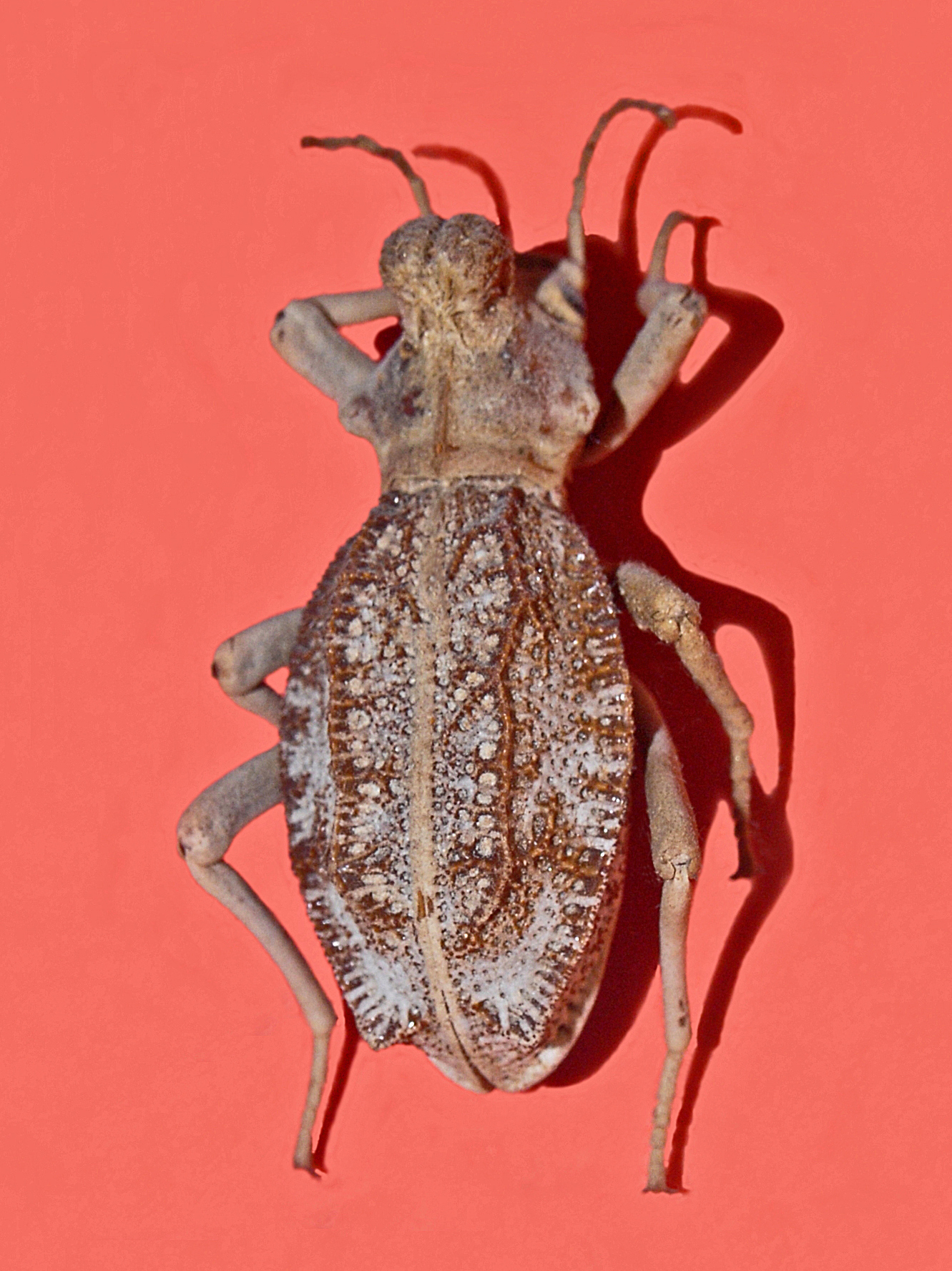
- Museum specimen of Sepidium magnum

Scientific classification
- Kingdom: Animalia
- Phylum: Arthropoda
- Clade: Pancrustacea
- Class: Insecta
- Order: Coleoptera
- Suborder: Polyphaga
- Infraorder: Cucujiformia
- Family: Tenebrionidae
- Genus: Sepidium
- Species: S. magnum

Binomial name
- Sepidium magnum C. J. Gahan, 1900

= Sepidium magnum =

Species of beetle

Sepidium magnum is a species of beetles of the family Tenebrionidae.

== Description ==
Sepidium magnum can reach a body length of about 29–35 millimetres (1.1–1.4 in) and a body width of about 12–15 millimetres (0.47–0.59 in). This species is among the largest of the genus. Body is brownish-black, while the head, prothorax, legs, and antennae show a pale fawn-coloured pubescence. Prothorax has a large prominent rounded tubercle. The surface of elytra is divided by two longitudinal sinuous carinse, with reticulating ridges on the sides.

== Distribution ==
This species can be found in Somalia.
