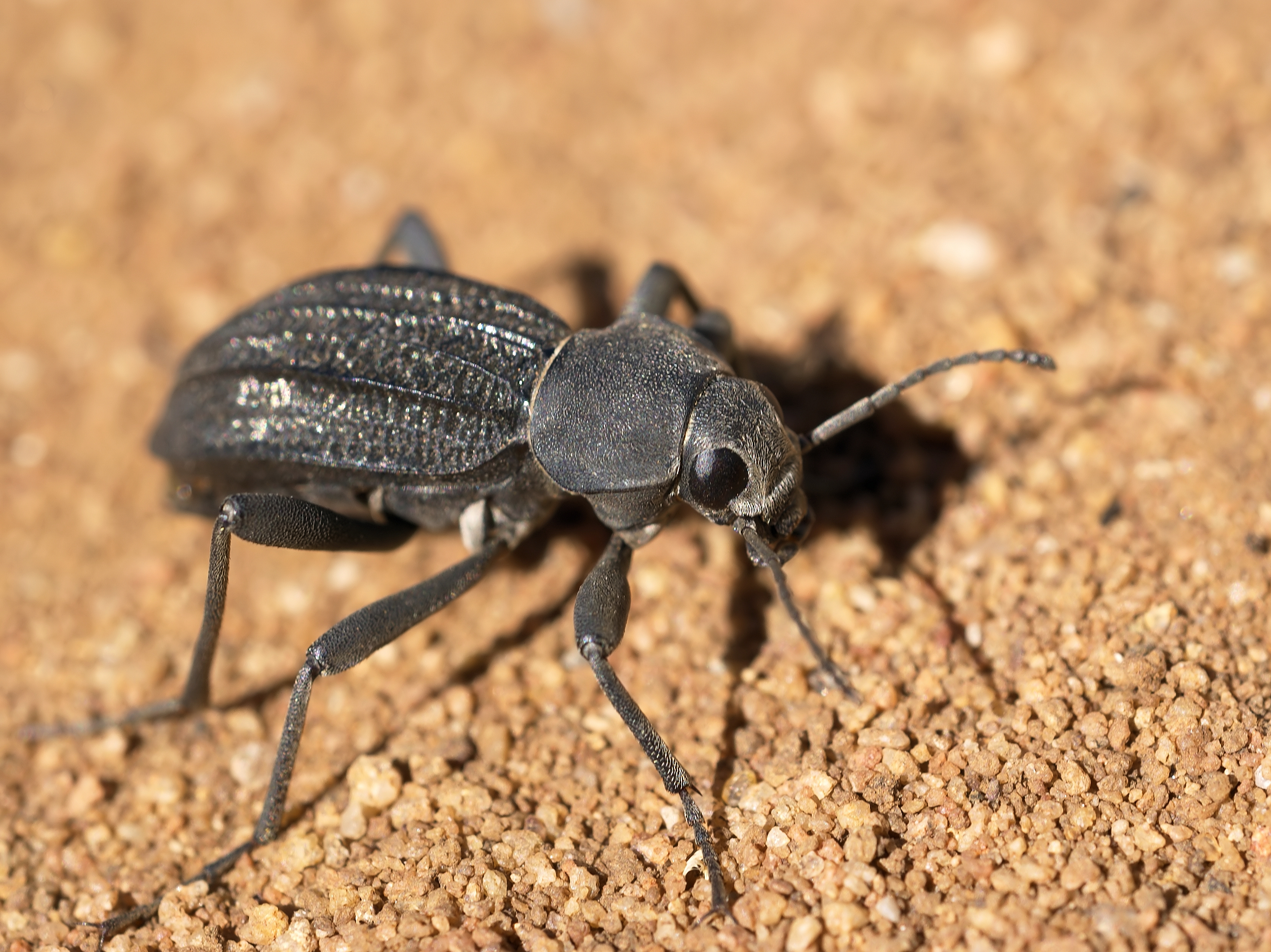
- Somaticus aeneus, subtribe Trachynotina
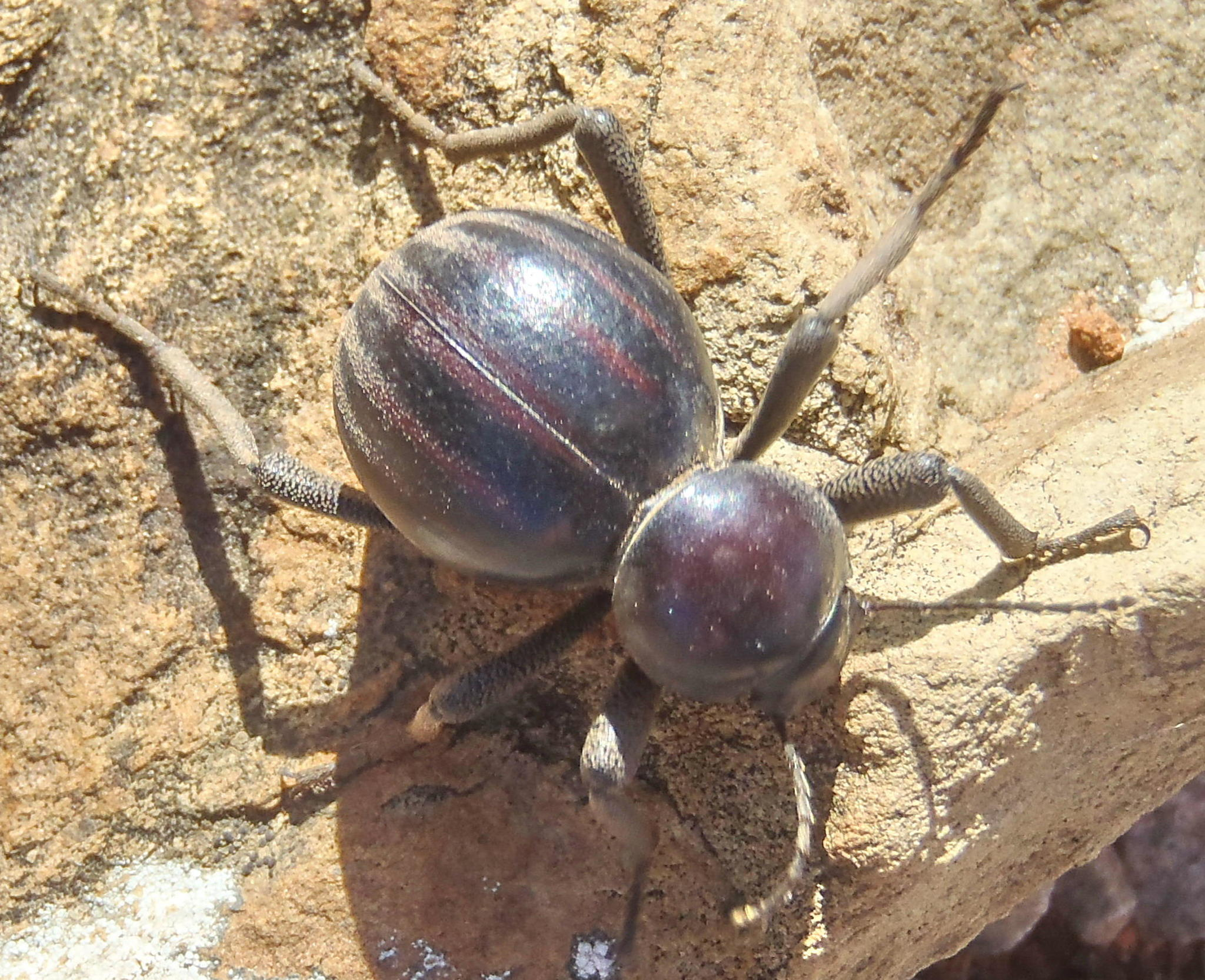
- Mariazofia, subtribe Molurina

Scientific classification
- Kingdom: Animalia
- Phylum: Arthropoda
- Clade: Pancrustacea
- Class: Insecta
- Order: Coleoptera
- Suborder: Polyphaga
- Infraorder: Cucujiformia
- Family: Tenebrionidae
- Subfamily: Pimeliinae
- Tribe: Sepidiini; Eschscholtz, 1829

Subtribes
- Hypomelina Koch, 1955; Molurina Solier, 1843; Oxurina Koch, 1955; Palpomodina Kamiński & Gearner, 2022; Sepidiina Eschscholtz, 1829; Trachynotina Koch, 1955

Synonyms
- Molurini Solier, 1834

= Sepidiini =

Tribe of beetles

The Sepidiini ("toktokkies") is a tribe of ground-dwelling darkling beetles (Tenebrionidae), that occurs across Africa, the Mediterranean Basin, the Arabian Peninsula and Mesopotamia. It is composed of many hundreds of species. The larvae of some species are known to damage crops. Around 1,000 species are known to represent Sepidiini. Recently studies by Kamiński et al. revealed high levels of taxonomic inconsistencies across the tribe, which resulted in descriptions of a series of new genera.

== Morphology ==
Their morphology is complex due to their richly divergent forms. They are distinguished from the diurnal taxa, by their well-developed and true hypomera of the elytra, the free mobility of the thorax and hind body, and the free and non-fused pleurital and pleural margins of the sterna and elytra respectively.

== Biology ==
Their morphology is believed to facilitate moisture absorption and accumulation, via the open body sutures and the loosely joined body parts. Subtribe Trachynotina excepting, they show an almost uniform tendency to be nocturnal, crepuscular or shade-loving. Like the tribe Tentyriini, their daily rhythm is based on a strictly nocturnal ancestral disposition. Their open and non-connate body sutures suggest the enjoyment of nocturnal conditions and night moisture.

At night, a surface secretion of a sometimes pruinescent or waxy substance has been noted on the bodies of genera Brinckia, Namibomodes, Synhimba and Ocnodes (syn. Phanerotomea). This is assumed to prevent evaporation.

Some Sepidiini (mainly Ocnodes Fåhraeus, 1870 and Mariazofia Kamiński, 2022) are commonly known for their tapping behaviour (sexual communication), which accounts for their vernacular name, the "toktokkies".

== Classification ==
The tribe Sepidiini is composed of 6 subtribes, 63 genera, and more than 1000 species. The following genera belong to the tribe Sepidiini:

- Hypomelina Koch, 1955
  - Brinckia Koch, 1962
  - Hypomelus Solier, 1843
  - Iugidorsum Louw, 1979
  - Sulcipectus Louw, 1979
  - Trachynotidus Péringuey, 1899
  - Triangulipenna Louw, 1979
  - Uniungulum Koch, 1962
- Molurina Solier, 1843
  - Amiantus (Fåhreus, 1870)
  - Argenticrinis Louw, 1979
  - Arturium Koch, 1951
  - Bombocnodulus Koch, 1955
  - Bouchardium Kamiński, 2024
  - Brachyphrynus Fairmaire, 1882
  - Chiliarchum Koch, 1954
  - Dichtha (Haag-Rutenberg, 1871)
  - Distretus (Haag-Rutenberg, 1871)
  - Euphrynus Fairmaire, 1897
  - Glyptophrynus Fairmaire, 1899
  - Huilamus Koch, 1953
  - Mariazofia Kamiński, 2022
  - Melanolophus Fairmaire, 1882
  - Moluris Latreille, 1802
  - Ocnodes Fåhraeus, 1870
  - Piesomera (Solier)
  - Phrynocolus Lacordaire, 1859
  - Phrynophanes Koch, 1951
  - Physophrynus Fairmaire, 1882
  - Psammodes (Kirby, 1819)
  - Psammophanes Lesne, 1922
  - Psammoryssus Kolbe, 1886
  - Psammotyria Koch, 1953
  - Stridulomus Koch, 1955
  - Tarsocnodes Gebien, 1920
  - Toktokkus (Kamiński & Gearner, 2022)
  - Tibiocnodes Gearner & Kamiński, 2021
  - Tibiocnodes (Gearner & Kamiński, 2022)
  - Tuberocnodes (Gearner & Kamiński, 2022)
- Oxurina Koch, 1955
  - Decoriplus Louw, 1979
  - Miripronotum Louw, 1979
  - Oxura Kirby, 1819
  - Pterostichula Koch, 1952
  - Stenethmus Gebien, 1937
  - Synhimba Koch, 1952
- Palpomodina Kamiński & Gearner, 2022
  - Namibomodes Koch, 1952
  - Palpomodes Koch, 1952
- Sepidiina Eschscholtz, 1829
  - Dimoniacis Koch, 1958
  - Echinotus Solier, 1843
  - Peringueyia Koch, 1958
  - Sepidiopsis Gestro, 1892
  - Sepidiostenus Fairmaire, 1884
  - Sepidium Fabricius, 1775
  - Vieta Laporte, 1840
  - Vietomorpha Fairmaire, 1887
- Trachynotina Koch, 1955
  - Cyrtoderes Dejean, 1834
  - Epairopsis Koch, 1955
  - Ethmus Haag-Rutenberg, 1873
  - Histrionotus Koch, 1955
  - Microphligra Koch, 1955
  - Ossiporis Pascoe, 1866
  - Oxycerus Koch, 1955
  - Somaticus Hope, 1840
  - Trachynotus Latreille, 1828
  - Trichethmus Gebien, 1937

== Gallery ==
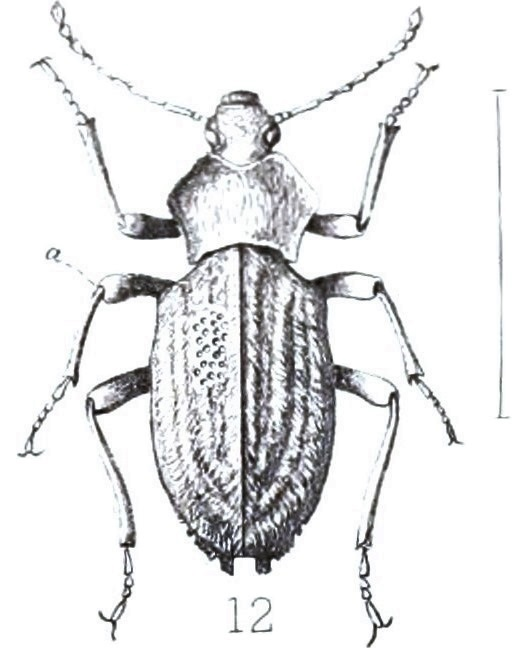
Hypomelus sp., Hypomelina

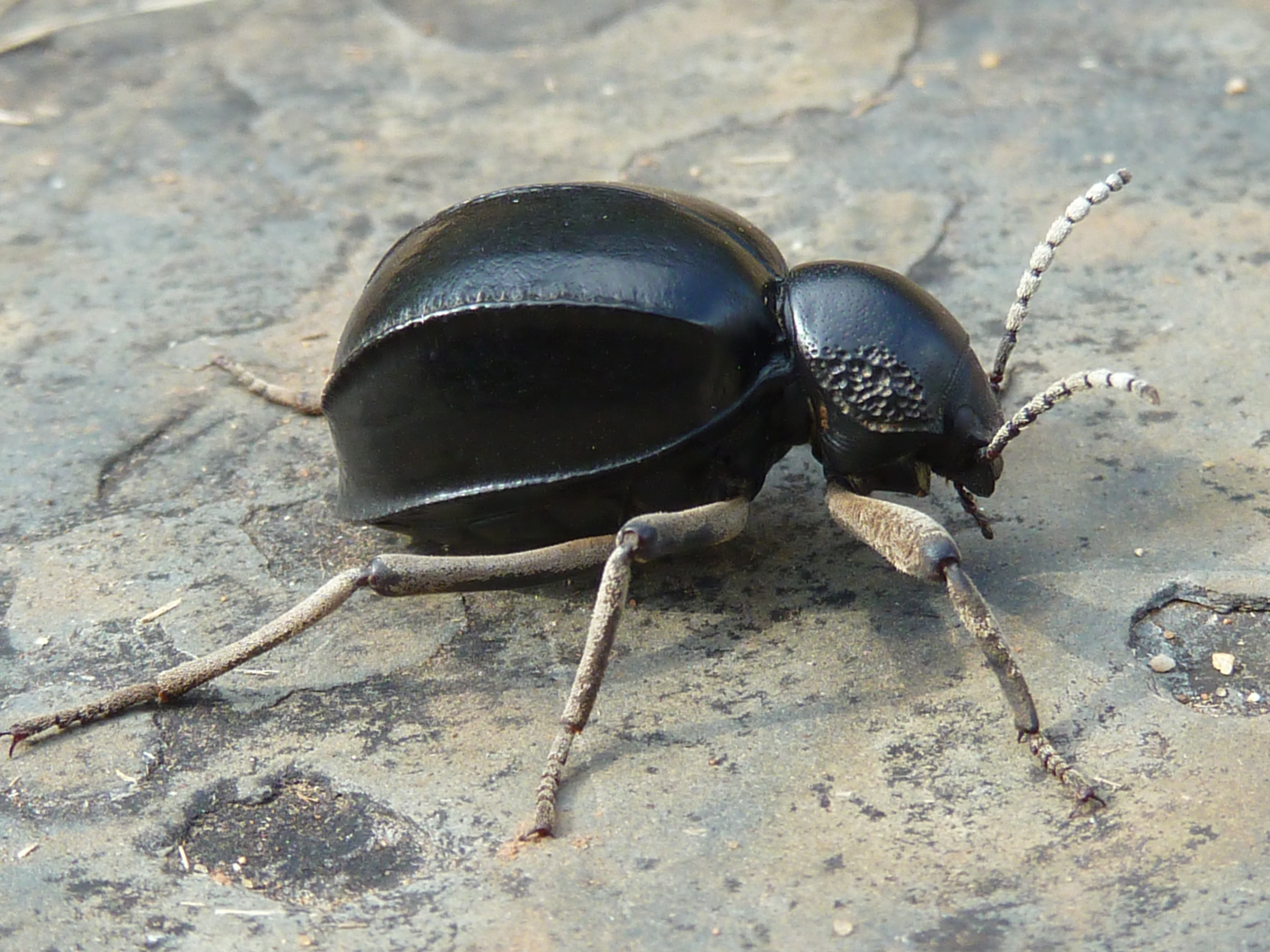
Dichtha sp.,
Molurina

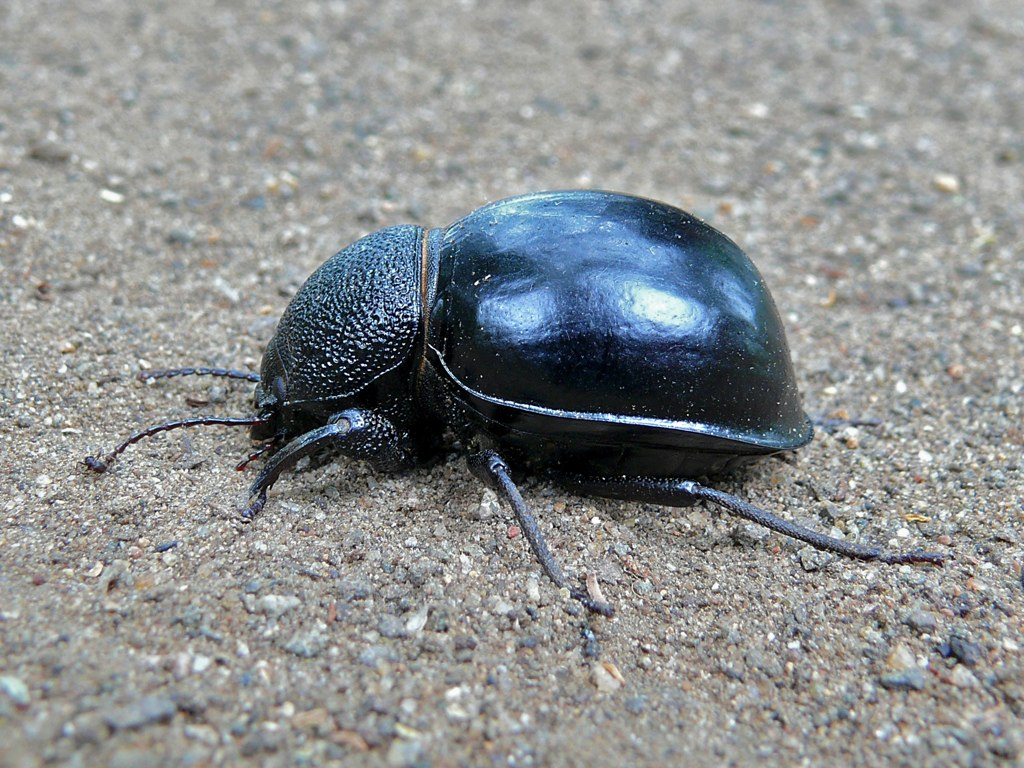
Phanerotomea sp., Phanerotomeina

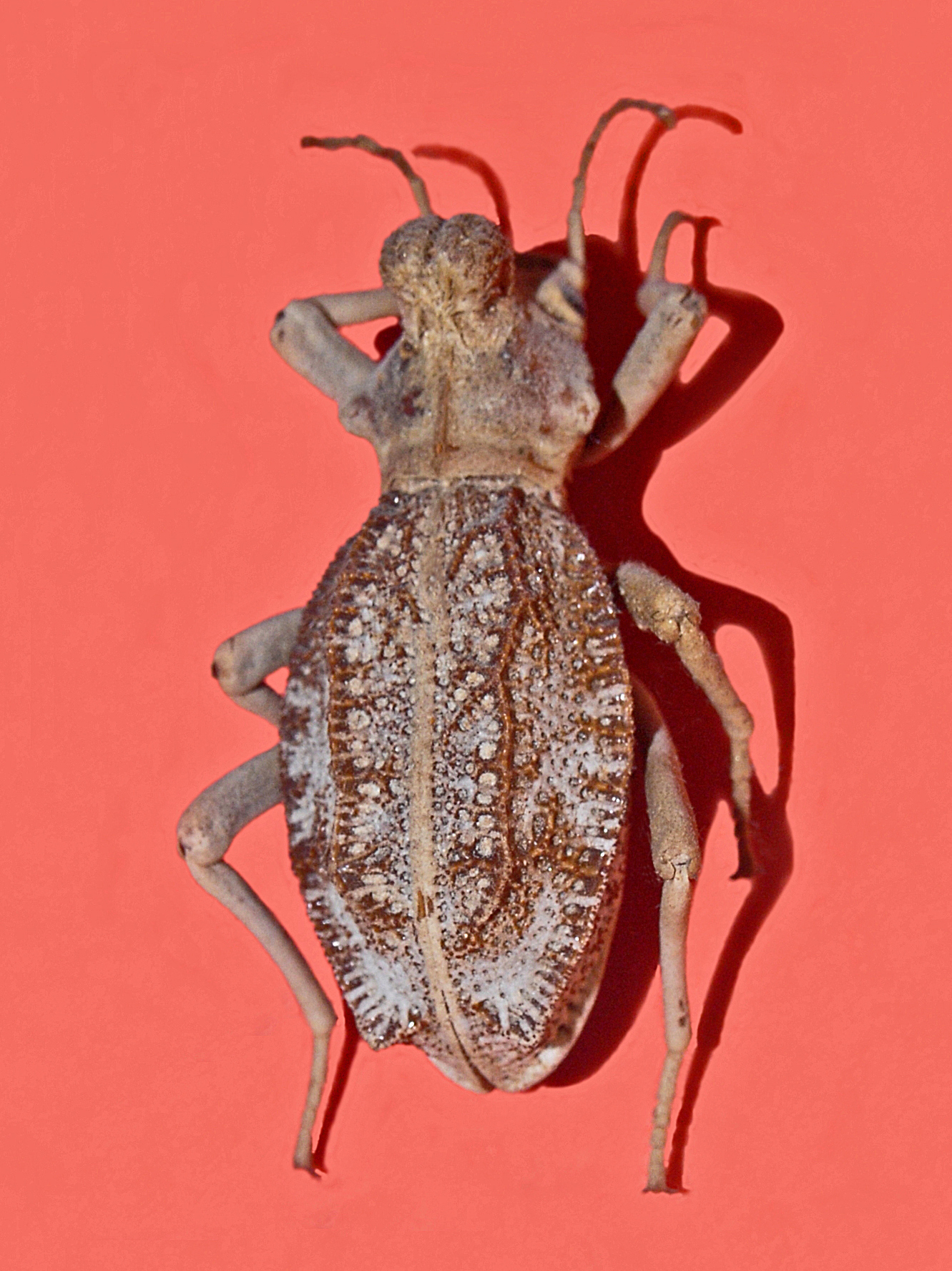
Sepidium sp.,
Sepidiina
