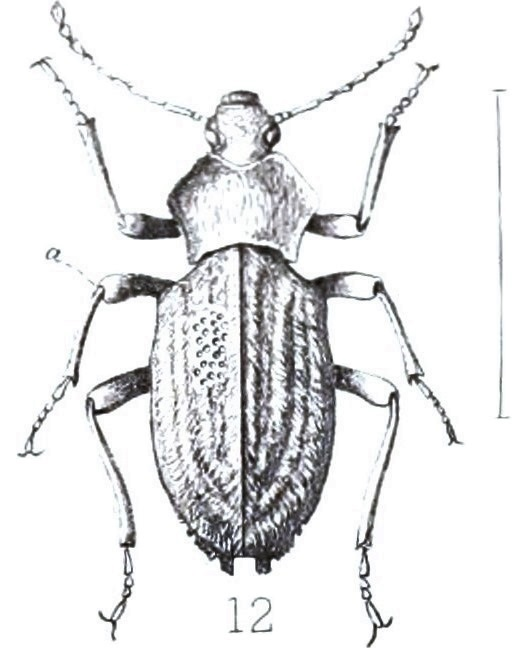
- H. flagrans

Scientific classification
- Domain: Eukaryota
- Kingdom: Animalia
- Phylum: Arthropoda
- Class: Insecta
- Order: Coleoptera
- Suborder: Polyphaga
- Infraorder: Cucujiformia
- Family: Tenebrionidae
- Subfamily: Pimeliinae
- Tribe: Sepidiini
- Subtribe: Hypomelina
- Genus: Hypomelus; Solier, 1843

= Hypomelus =

Genus of beetles

Hypomelus is a genus of beetles of the family Tenebrionidae. It is the type genus of the Hypomelina subtribe.

== Selected species ==
There are about 15 species:

- Hypomelus basalis Haag-Rutenberg JG, 1871
- Hypomelus flagrans Péringuey LA, 1899
- Hypomelus interstitialis Haag-Rutenberg, JG 1871
- Hypomelus obliquatus Solier AJJ, 1843
- Hypomelus obliteratus Solier AJJ, 1843
- Hypomelus osbecki (Billberg, 1815)
- Hypomelus peringueyi Gebien H, 1910
- Hypomelus peronatus Germar EF, 1824
- Hypomelus procerut
- Hypomelus reflexicollis Haag-Rutenberg JG, 1871
- Hypomelus reflexus Haag-Rutenberg JG, 1871
- Hypomelus servus Péringuey LA, 1899
- Hypomelus setosocostatus Haag-Rutenberg JG, 1871
- Hypomelus villosocostatus Solier AJJ, 1843
- Hypomelus vulpinus Haag-Rutenberg JG, 1873
