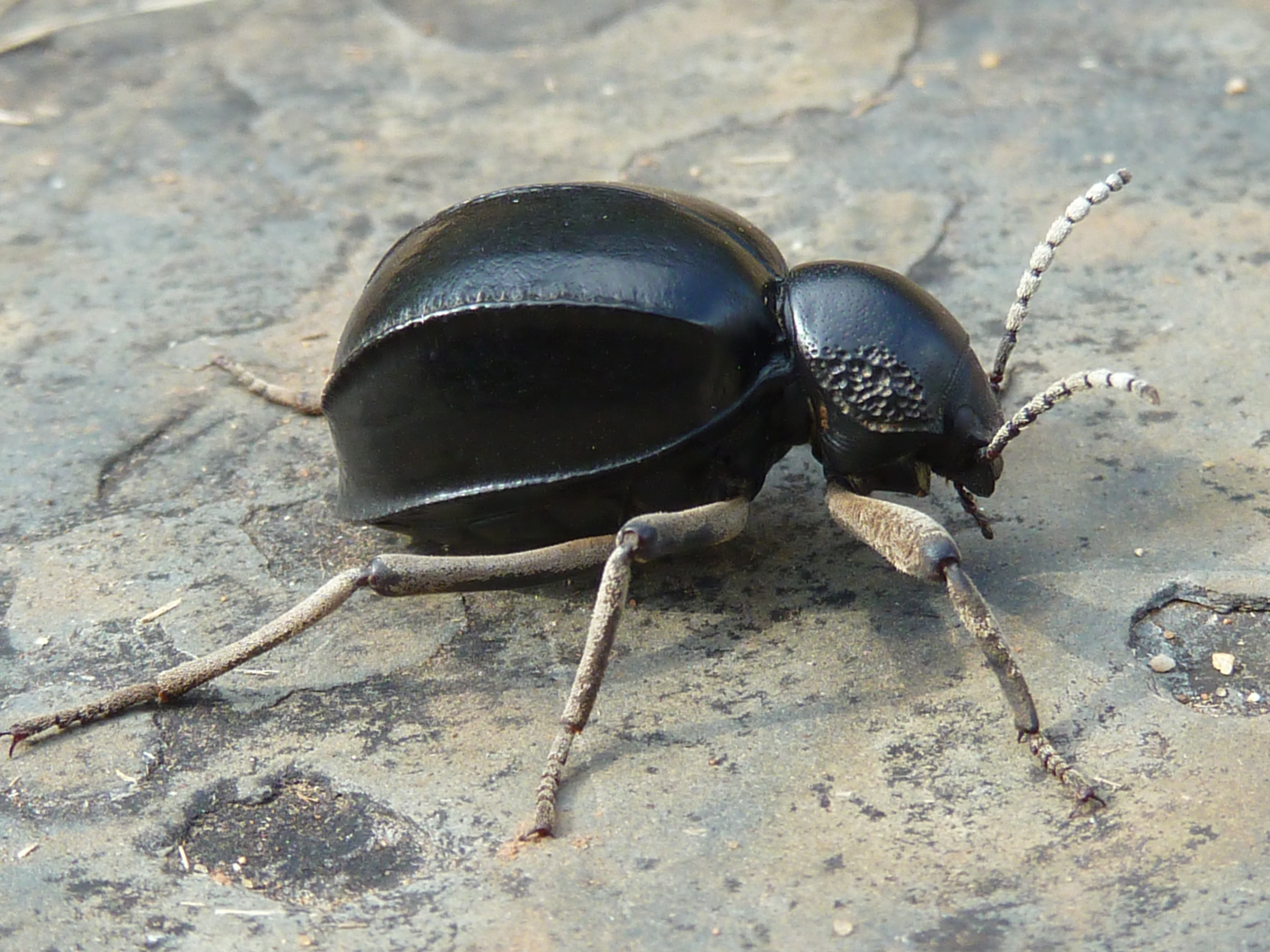
- D. cubica

Scientific classification
- Kingdom: Animalia
- Phylum: Arthropoda
- Clade: Pancrustacea
- Class: Insecta
- Order: Coleoptera
- Suborder: Polyphaga
- Infraorder: Cucujiformia
- Family: Tenebrionidae
- Tribe: Sepidiini
- Genus: Dichtha; Haag-Rutenberg JG, 1871

= Dichtha =

White-legged toktokkies

Genus of beetles

The white-legged toktokkies (genus Dichtha) are ground-dwelling, Afrotropical beetles in the family Tenebrionidae. They are stout, black beetles of about 2 – 2.5 cm in length. The antennae and legs are covered in pale to brownish down. Like the related genus Psammodes, the adults tap out a rhythm on the ground to attract and locate mates. They feed on both plant and animal material. Some species, like D. inflata, may feign death.

== Species ==
The species include:

- Dichtha cubica Guérin-Méneville, 1845 — White-legged toktokkie
- Dichtha inflata Gerstaecker, 1854 — Red-backed toktokkie, Kafadala
- Dichtha modesta Robiche, 2013
- Dichtha transvalica Brancsik, 1914
- Dichtha quedenfeldti Kolbe, 1886

A catalogue of the Sepidiini tribe from 2019 considers Dichtha incantatoris Koch, 1952 a nomen nudum and therefore invalid. A likely source of this erroneous name is the popular Field Guide to Insects of South Africa by M Picker, C Griffiths & A Weaving. Specimens identified under this name are likely Dichtha cubica (see this explanation by iNaturalist curator Riaan Stals).
