= Eduard Vieta =

Spanish psychiatrist (born 1963)

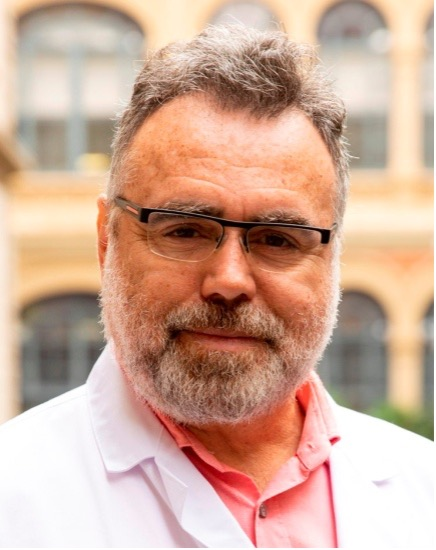
- Born: 16 January 1963 (age 63); Barcelona, Spain
- Education: Autonomous University of Barcelona
- Medical career
- Field: Psychiatry
- Institutions: University of Barcelona, Hospital Clinic of Barcelona
- Sub-specialties: Bipolar disorder
- Website: https://www.clinicbarcelona.org/profesionales/eduard-vieta

Eduard Vieta Pascual is a Catalan psychiatrist from Spain known for his work in the field of mood disorders. His unit is a world reference in clinical care, research and teaching of bipolar disorder and depression.

== Education ==
Eduard Vieta was born in Barcelona, Spain. He studied medicine at the Autonomous University of Barcelona and graduated in 1987. He did his residency training at the Hospital Clinic of Barcelona and became a specialist in Psychiatry in 1991. He subsequently received his PhD with honors at the University of Barcelona in 1994.

== Career ==
=== Research focus/interests ===
Dr. Vieta has focused his research activity on the study of the causes and the pharmacological and psychological treatment of bipolar disorder and depression, as well as in Precision Psychiatry. His contributions stand out for identifying neurocognitive dysfunctions and promoting the clinical development of new pharmacological treatments to address this condition. Additionally, his research has concentrated on psychotherapies such as psychoeducation and cognitive remediation to improve functioning and quality of life for patients with bipolar disorder. Dr. Vieta has made contributions to numerous treatment guidelines for bipolar disorder and is the founder of the concept of ‘Precision Psychiatry‘.

=== Awards ===
Dr. Vieta has received the following awards:

- Aristotle Award (2005)
- Mogens Schou Award (2007)
- Strategic Research Award of the Spanish Society of Biological Psychiatry (2009)
- Official College of Physicians Award for Professional Excellence (2011)
- Colvin Prize for Outstanding Achievement in Mood Disorders Research by the Brain & Behavior Research Foundation (2012)
- Clinical Neuroscience Lilly Award by the International College of Neuropsychopharmacology (2014)
- Doctor Honoris Causa by the University of Valencia (2016).
- World’s Best Researcher of the Year by the World Federation of Societies of Biological Psychiatry (WFSBP) (2017)
- Simón Bolívar Award of the American Psychiatric Association (2017)
- Honorary member of the Spanish Society of Biological Psychiatry (2019)
- Josep Trueta Award granted by the Academy of Medical and Health Sciences of Catalonia and Balearic Islands (2021)
- Award for scientific dissemination and humanism from the University of Barcelona (2022)
- Maimónides Award from the University of Córdoba
- Admirables 2024 Award by Diario Médico
- ISBD Kupfer-Frank Distinctive Contribution Award 2024 - International Society for Bipolar Disorders (ISBD)
- Member of the Reial Acadèmia de Medicina de Catalunya

=== Present and past appointments ===
Dr. Vieta is the current Head of the Psychiatry and Psychology Service of the Hospital Clínic of Barcelona and of the research group on bipolar and depressive disorders of the Institut d'Investigació Biomèdica August Pi i Sunyer (IDIBAPS), and is also a professor of Psychiatry at the Faculty of Medicine and Health Sciences and the Institute of Neurosciences of the University of Barcelona. Dr. Vieta was also the director of the Bipolar Disorder Research Program and scientific director of the Mental Health Network Research Center (CIBERSAM), funded by the Spanish Ministry of Economy and Competitiveness, as well as former treasurer of the European College of Neuropsychopharmacology (ECNP).

Dr. Vieta is the current editor-in-chief of the journal European Neuropsychopharmacology and part of the European College of Neuropsychopharmacology (ECNP) Executive Committee (2022-2025). Additionally, he is on the editorial board of a number of international scientific journals, such as American Journal of Psychiatry, The Lancet Psychiatry, Psychotherapy Psychosomatics, the International Journal of Neuropsychopharmacology, European Neuropsychopharmacology, the Journal of Clinical Psychiatry, Bipolar Disorders, and the journal Journal of Affective Disorders. He was appointed to the Advisory Committee of the R&D&I Program in the Hungarian Presidency of the European Union. Considered among the psychiatrist with the best reputation in Spain (Health Monitor 2014 and Forbes), he has been an advisor to the European presidency in neuroscience research, a visiting professor at Harvard University (United States) and an Honorary Doctor from the University of Valencia.

=== Publications ===
To date, he has published more than 1,000 original articles in national and international journals, more than 500 book chapters and 50 books on bipolar disorder. He currently accumulates more than 100,000 citations, and an h-index of 159, which has made him the most cited scientist in the world in bipolar disorder and one of the most cited in biomedical sciences (Highly Cited Scientist / Most influential Scientific Minds).
