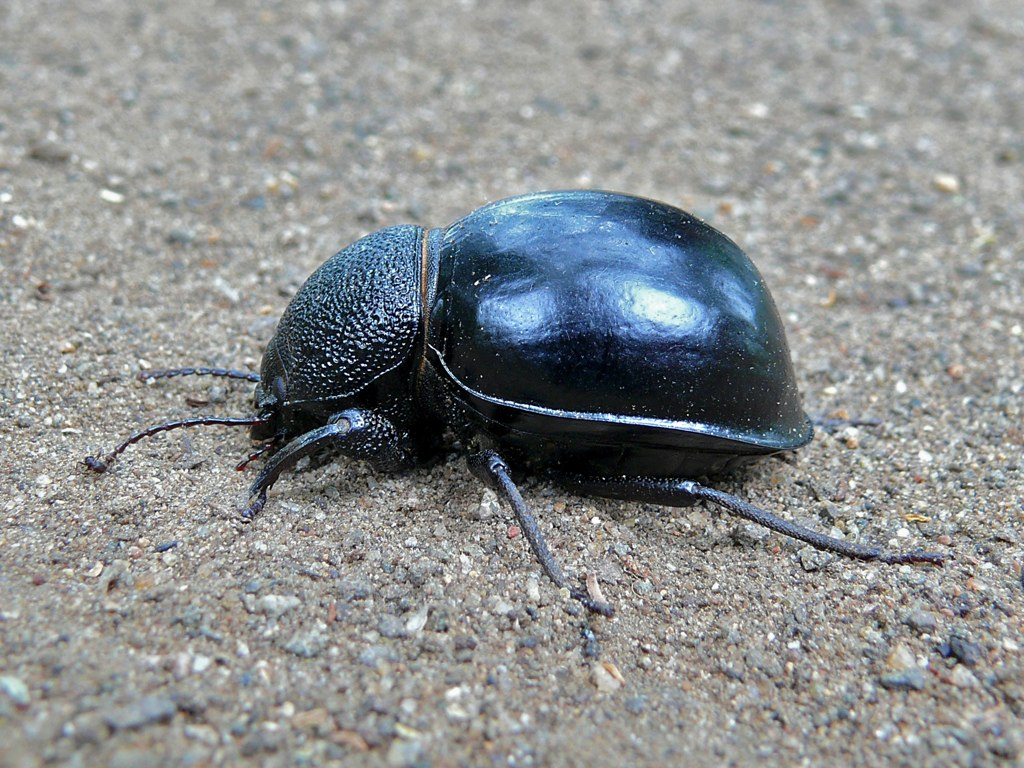
- O. virago in the Kruger Park

Scientific classification
- Kingdom: Animalia
- Phylum: Arthropoda
- Class: Insecta
- Order: Coleoptera
- Suborder: Polyphaga
- Infraorder: Cucujiformia
- Family: Tenebrionidae
- Tribe: Sepidiini
- Genus: Ocnodes; Fåhraeus, 1870

Synonyms
- Phanerotomea Koch, 1958

= Ocnodes =

Helmet toktokkies

Genus of beetles

The helmet toktokkies (genus Ocnodes) are ground-dwelling, Afrotropical beetles in the family Tenebrionidae.

== Species ==
A selection of species include:

- Ocnodes acuductus (Ancey, 1883)
- Ocnodes adamantina (Koch, 1952)
- Ocnodes argenteofasciata (Koch, 1953)
- Ocnodes arnoldi (Koch, 1952)
- Ocnodes badeni (Haag-Rutenberg, 1871) (after Kaminski et al. 2020)
- Ocnodes concinna Fåhraeus, 1870
- Ocnodes damarinus (Péringuey, 1904) (after Kaminski et al. 2020)
- Ocnodes kruegeri Kamiński, Müller, Schawaller, Gearner & Smith, 2020
- Ocnodes scabricollis (Gerstaecker, 1854)
- Ocnodes scrobicollis Fåhraeus, 1870

Note: Several species that were previously placed the former subgenus Ocnodes (Chiliarchum) (e.g. Kamiński et al., 2019), were later included in the valid genus Chiliarchum in Kamiński et al., 2020.

== Etymology ==
In a checklist of Ocnodes Fåhraeus, 1870 by Kamiński et al. 2019, the genus was treated as masculine, alongside the type species being subsequently designated as Ocnodes scrobicollis Fåhraeus, 1870. Per ICZN Article 30.1.4.4, a compound genus-group name ending in -odes is masculine unless its (original) author "stated that it had another gender or treated it as such by combining it with an adjectival species-group name in another gender form." Here, scrobicollis Fåhraeus, 1870 is a latinized epithet in common gender (masculine or feminine), but Fåhraeus, 1870 also originally included a second species, namely Ocnodes concinna Fåhraeus, 1870 with feminine inflection of its epithet. Therefore, the generic name Ocnodes Fåhraeus, 1870 is defensibly feminine rather than masculine. It is instead listed as feminine in a subsequent catalog of Tenebrionidae genera by Bouchard et al., 2021
