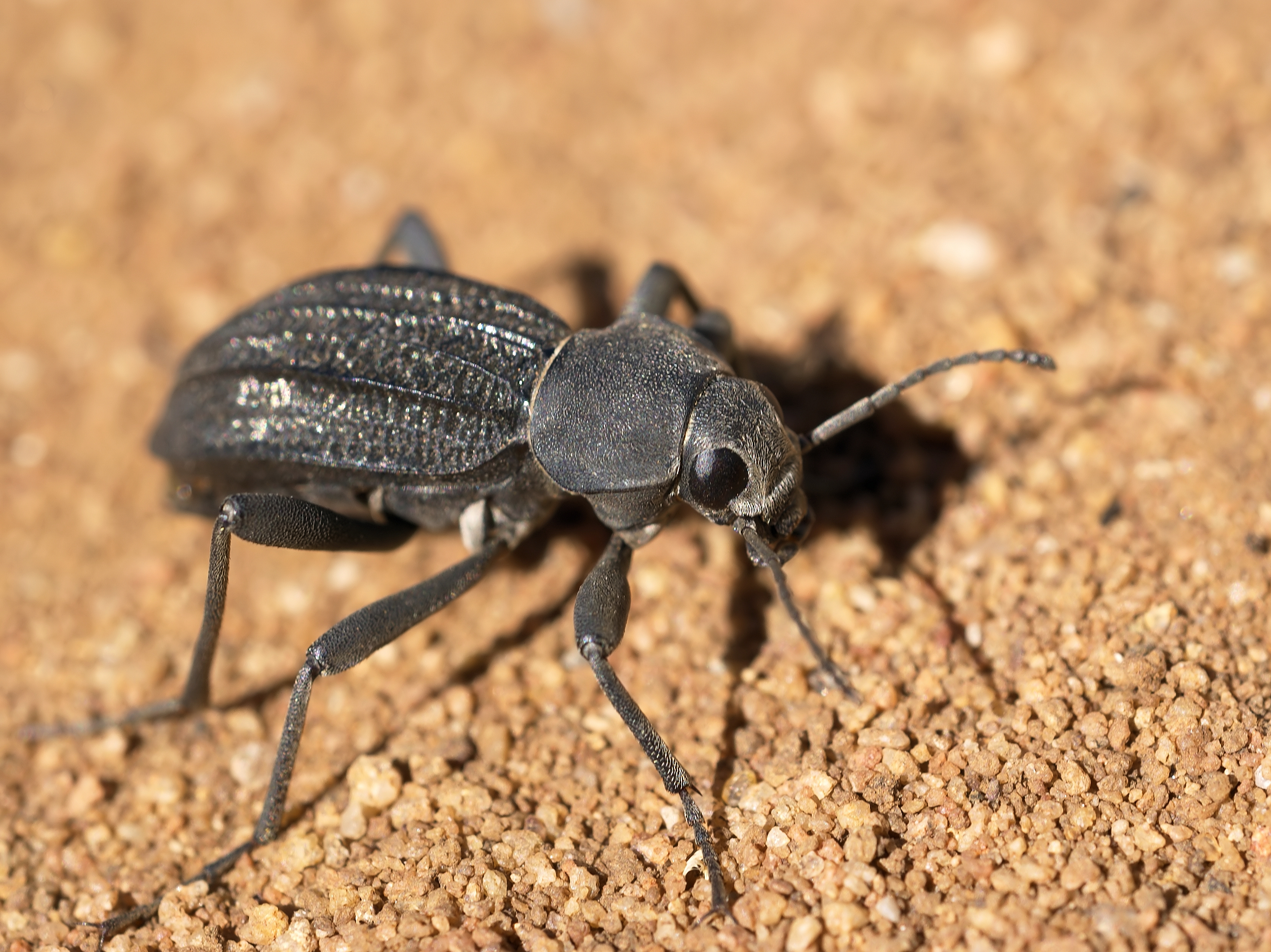
- S. aeneus, subtribe Trachynotina

Scientific classification
- Kingdom: Animalia
- Phylum: Arthropoda
- Class: Insecta
- Order: Coleoptera
- Suborder: Polyphaga
- Infraorder: Cucujiformia
- Family: Tenebrionidae
- Tribe: Sepidiini
- Genus: Somaticus; Hope, 1840

= Somaticus =

Tar darkling beetles

Afrotropical genus of beetles

The tar darkling beetles (Somaticus) are an Afrotropical genus of darkling beetles (Tenebrionidae). Adults are omnivorous scavengers, and the larvae, known as false wireworms, feed on plant roots. The larvae of several species are known to damage maize crops. The adults are matte black with longitudinal ridges on the pronotum and elytra, and may be covered in hairs of different colours.

Species include:

- Somaticus aeneus Solier, 1843
- Somaticus angulatus (Fahraeus)
- Somaticus cinctus Haag-Rutenberg, 1873
- Somaticus damarinus (Peringuey, 1904)
- Somaticus distinctus Peringuey, 1892
- Somaticus geniculatus
- Somaticus haagi Peringuey, 1886
- Somaticus metropolis
- Somaticus spinosus Solier, 1843
- Somaticus terricola
- Somaticus vestitus
- Somaticus wahlbergi Haag-Rutenberg, 1873
