= Toktokkies =

Beetles that make a distinct tapping noise

Toktokkies are various species of beetles that belong to the large Tenebrionidae family, also known as darkling beetles. Toktokkies do not belong to a particular tribe or genus of tenebrionids, but rather a selection of flightless species that make distinct noises by tapping on the ground with the abdomen. The Tenebrionidae family to which these beetles belong is quite large, with almost 3,500 species inhabiting Southern Africa. Nearly 200 species of toktokkies inhabit the Namibia and 20 have adapted to the extreme temperatures of the Namib Desert. The most common toktokkies in the Namib Desert are the fog basking beetle (Onymacris unguicularis) and the button beetle or trench-digging beetle (Lepidochora discoidalis).

== Species ==
The "fog-basking" beetle (Onymacris unguicularis) gets its water source from the fog through special biological adaptations. When the fog rolls in at night or early in the morning, these beetles climb to the peak of the dunes, where the water condensation is most dense. The beetle performs a handstand by lowering its head and raising its posterior. Some beetles have hydrophilic bumps on their back and hydrophobic valleys which make water collection more efficient. The fog condenses on its back and drips into the mouthparts. Through this process, the “fog-basking” beetles can drink 40% of their body-mass.

The "fog-trapping" beetle (Lepidochora discoidalis) also gets its water from the fog, but it acquires it in a different manner. After foraging for the first half of the night, the “fog-trapping” beetle burrows into the sand. It returns to the surface late at night or early in the morning when the fog rolls across the Namib Desert. It digs a trench into the side of the dune and droplets of water build up on ridges of the trench. The “fog-trapping” beetles then lick off the droplets of water.

== Physical description ==
Toktokkies are about 65mm in length and are black or dark brown in color. They are stout, wingless creatures with a tough outer casing. Although they once had wings, tenebrionid beetles are flightless. Their wings have evolved over time, transferring from separated to move aside for flight to fused on their backs. Once this evolutionary process occurred, a small cavity was left where the wings used to fold. This has reduced water loss caused by evaporation because the Toktokkies’ respiratory pores now open into this humid cavity, instead of being exposed all the time to the dry air.

== Habitat ==
Toktokkies live throughout Namibia. Nearly 20 species have adapted to live in arid climates, like the Namib Desert. Most species inhabit slipfaces and valleys between dunes, searching for the sheltered side of the dunes because large quantities of windblown detritus accumulate in these spaces. Their habitat choice is influenced by food supply. The slipfaces, although they occupy less than 1% of dune surfaces, are filled with insects and species endemic to the Namib Desert.

== Behavior ==
The toktokkie beetles have specific behaviors that allow them to survive in arid environments like the Namib Desert. Most of the beetles perform “headstands” to obtain moisture from the fog that rolls in from the Atlantic Ocean. Toktokkies time their movements around the fog, which usually rolls in during the late evening and early morning. The beetles will climb a dune and perform a “headstand” facing the west and collect fog on their entire body. Toktokkie beetles receive their name from a unique clicking noise they make. Their name is derived from the children's game where players knock on front doors and then run away. These beetles create this noise by raising and lowering their abdomen, like knocking, in quick sequences.

== Adaptations to adverse environmental conditions ==
The size of these beetles, being larger than other beetles, helps them keep cool. Also, their shells made of thick chitin help keep out heat and increase moisture. Living in arid environments, they have traded their separate wings for one fused wing that facilitates a moisture protection system. They now “breathe” through a hole that is under their fused wing. This adaptation allows them to trap moisture when they breathe. They have also learned to burrow in the sand when they get too hot.

== Reproduction ==
Toktokkie beetles use the tapping noises as a mating ritual and this is used for males and females to communicate with one another. The male will initiate the tapping and a receptive female will respond. After a period of exchanged tapping signals, the pair will make contact and mate. Afterwards, the female beetle will lay single eggs approximately 6mm in length which she places in a shallow hollow in the earth's surface. The long, yellow larvae then hatch and mature in the soil, feeding on the roots of small plants underground as well as on detritus.
