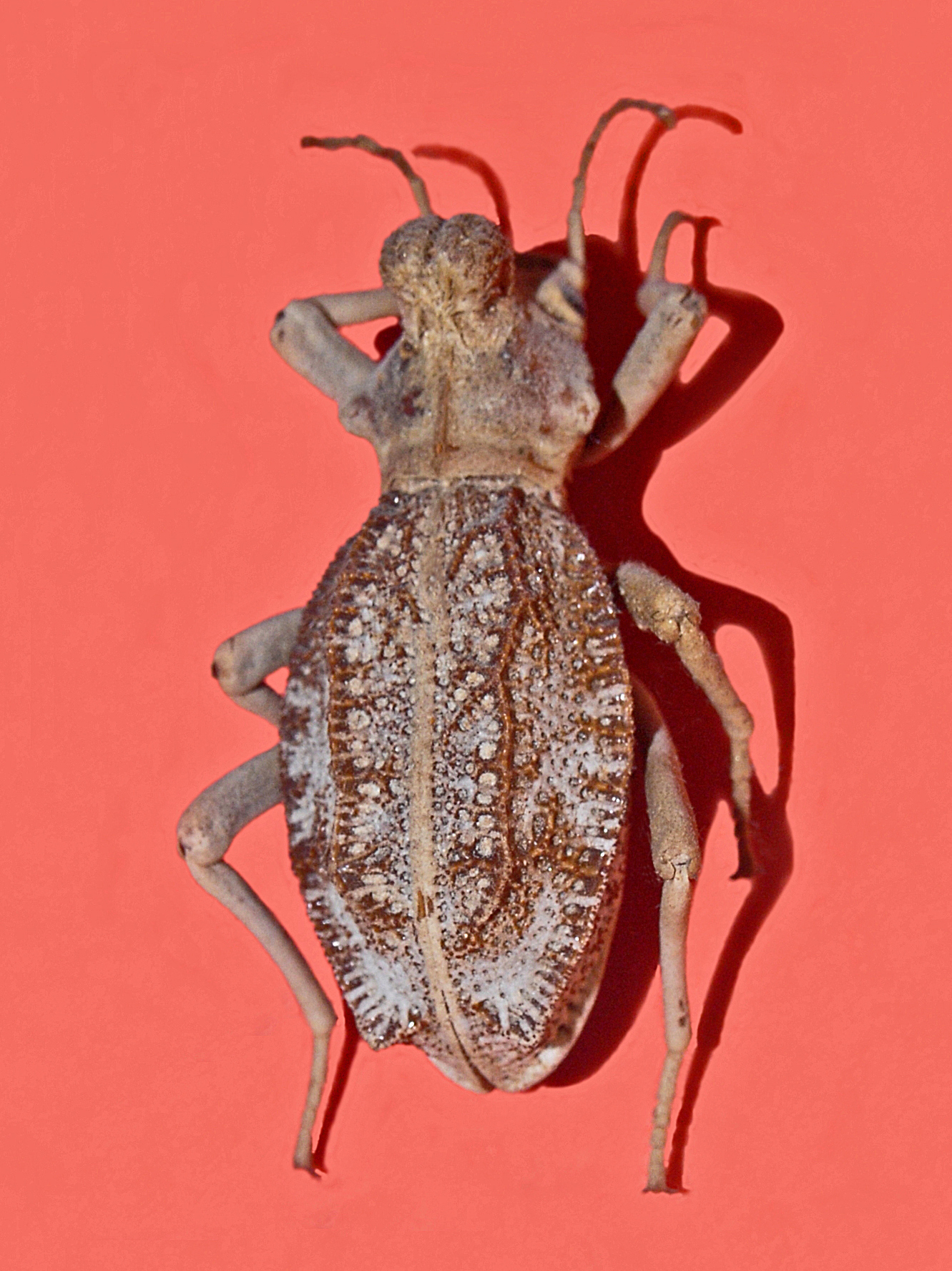
- Museum specimen of S. magnum

Scientific classification
- Kingdom: Animalia
- Phylum: Arthropoda
- Class: Insecta
- Order: Coleoptera
- Suborder: Polyphaga
- Infraorder: Cucujiformia
- Family: Tenebrionidae
- Tribe: Sepidiini
- Genus: Sepidium; Fabricius, 1775

= Sepidium =

Genus of beetles

Sepidium is a genus of beetles of the family Tenebrionidae. It is the type genus of its tribe, Sepidiini.

== Selected species ==
- Sepidium aliferum Erichson, 1841
- Sepidium bidentatum Solier, 1843
- Sepidium crassicaudatum Gestro, 1878
- Sepidium elongatum Mal, 1984
- Sepidium lusitanicum Kaszab & Pinheiro, 1972
- Sepidium magnum C.J.Gahan, 1900
- Sepidium siculum Solier, 1843
- Sepidium tricuspidatum Fabricius, 1775
