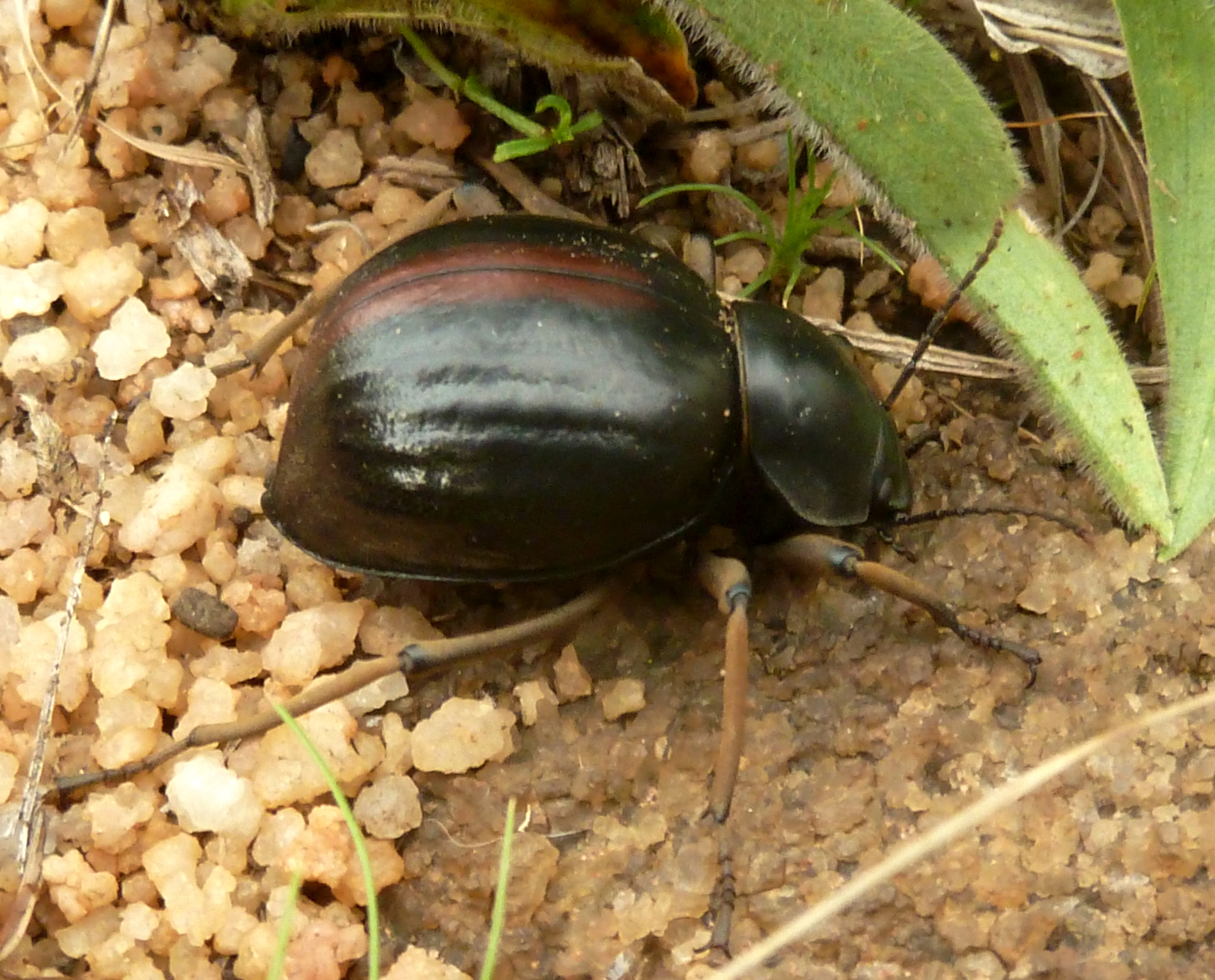

Scientific classification
- Domain: Eukaryota
- Kingdom: Animalia
- Phylum: Arthropoda
- Class: Insecta
- Order: Coleoptera
- Suborder: Polyphaga
- Infraorder: Cucujiformia
- Family: Tenebrionidae
- Subtribe: Molurina
- Genus: Psammodes; Kirby, 1819

= Psammodes =

Genus of beetles

Psammodes is a genus of ground-dwelling Afrotropical beetles in the family Tenebrionidae. They are black or dark rufous in color and stout in shape, and average about 2.6 cm in body length. Like the related genus Dichtha, the adults tap out a rhythm on the ground to attract and locate mates. Habitats are varied, from coastal forests to ridges and hills, woodland and deserts.

== Species ==
This genus underwent a major taxonomic revision in 2022; with most species having been reclassified as Mariazofia. As of late 2022, the genus contains 3 species, including:

- Psammodes longicornis (Kirby, 1819)
- Psammodes probes (Péringuey, 1899)
- Psammodes sklodowskae Kamiński & Gearner, 2022
