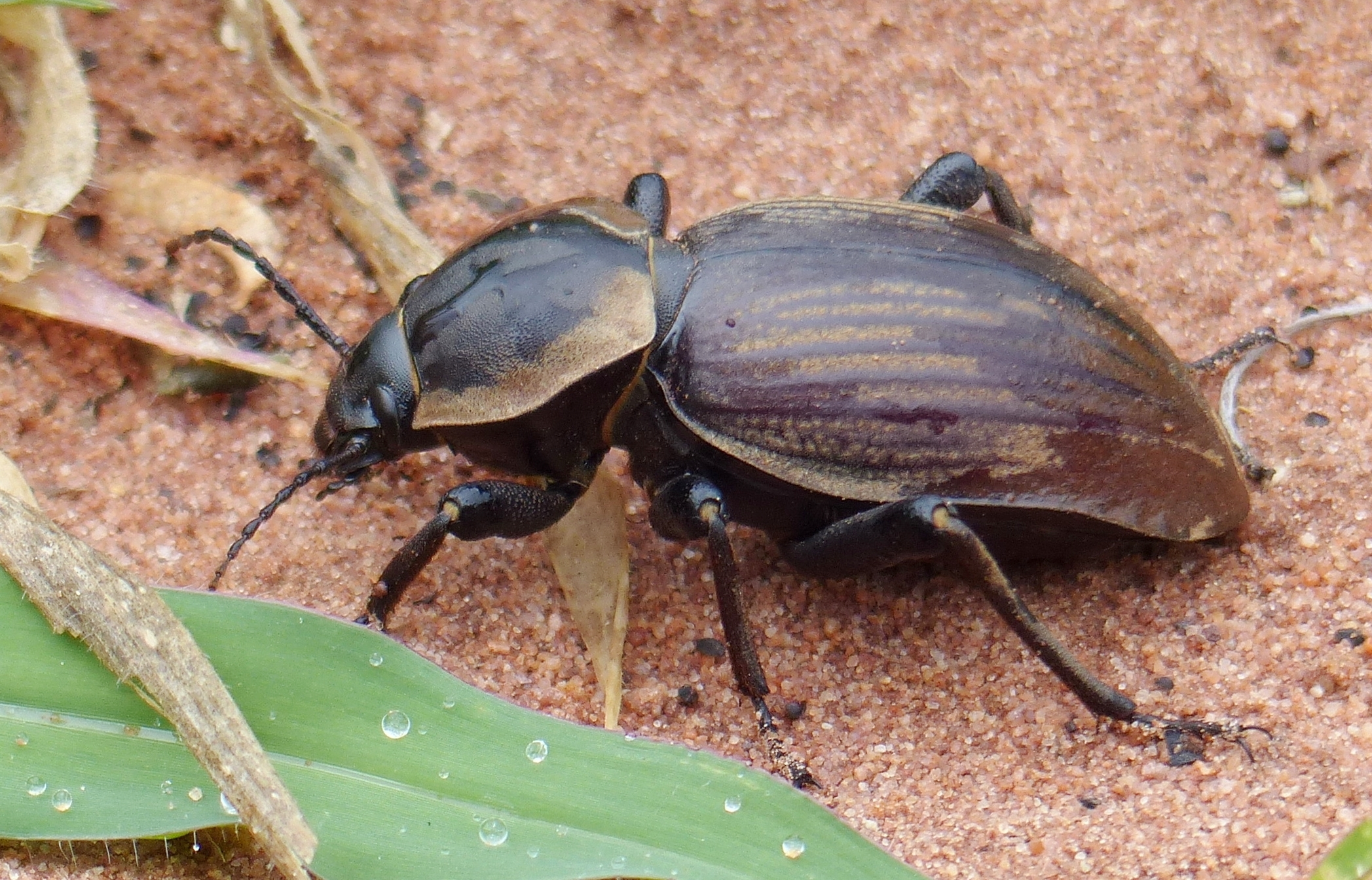
- A member of Phanerotomeina in Kruger National Park

Scientific classification
- Kingdom: Animalia
- Phylum: Arthropoda
- Class: Insecta
- Order: Coleoptera
- Suborder: Polyphaga
- Infraorder: Cucujiformia
- Family: Tenebrionidae
- Tribe: Sepidiini
- Genus: Chiliarchum; Carl Koch, 1954 [or 1953]

= Chiliarchum =

Genus of beetles

The genus Chiliarchum are ground-dwelling, Afrotropical beetles in the family Tenebrionidae.. In some schemes it has been presented as a subgenus Ocnodes (Chiliarchum) (e.g. Kamiński et al., 2019), but later treated as a valid genus in Kamiński et al., 2020.

== Species ==
The species include: (or a subgenus from older schemes)

- Chiliarchum arnoldi (Koch, 1952)
- Chiliarchum bertolonii (Guérin-Méneville, 1844)
- Chiliarchum freyi (Koch, 1952)
- Chiliarchum guerini (Haag-Rutenberg, 1871)
- Chiliarchum junodi (Péringuey, 1899)
