= Johann Georg Haag-Rutenberg =

German entomologist, lawyer and farmer

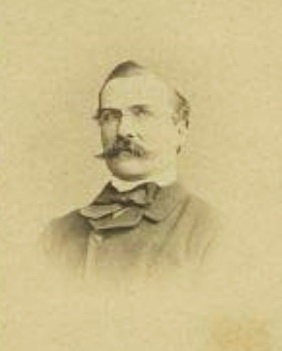
Johann Georg Haag-Rutenberg (before 1879)

Johann Georg Haag-Rutenberg (10 October 1830 Frankfurt am Main – 20 November 1879 Frankfurt am Main) was a German entomologist, lawyer and farmer, who was also an authority on the Coleoptera. In zoological names he is mentioned as an author under the name "Haag".

Haag suffered from eye, ear and possible neurological problems and shot himself with a gun.

His Coleoptera collections are kept at the following places -

- Melolonthidae 1878 via G. Metzler 1880 at Dt. Ent. Inst. Berlin
- Tenebrionidae and various Heteromera ex parte 1880 via Clemens Müller 1903 at Zool. Staatsslg. München
- Erotylidae and Languridae 1880 via E. Fleutiaux at Neervoort van de Poll
- Coccinellidae, Chrysomelidae, Cetoniidae and duplicate Heteromera 1880 via G. Kraatz 1909 at Dt. Ent. Inst. Berlin
- Buprestidae 1880 at F. Baden, 1934 via A. Théry at Mus. Nation. Hist. Nat. Paris
- Meloidae 1880 at Mus. Hist. Nat. Belg. Brüssel
- Cerambycidae at Witte/Breslau
- Tenebrionidae ex parte at Mus. civ. St. nat. Genova

== Citations ==
- Anonymous 1879: [Haag-Ruthenberg, J. G.] Le Naturaliste Canadien, Quebec 1, p. 148
- Anonymous 1880: [Biogrphien] Zoologischer Anzeiger, Leipzig 3
- Dohrn, C. A. 1880: [Haag-Ruthenberg, J. G.] Stett. ent. Ztg., Stettin 41, p. 111-113
- Fitch, E. A. 1880: [Biographien] The Entomologist, London 13
- Harold, von 1880: [Haag-Ruthenberg, J. G.] Mitt. Münchn. ent. Ver. 4, p. 173-175
- Kraatz, G. 1880: [Haag-Ruthenberg, J. G.] Deutsche entomologische Zeitschrift, Beiheft 24, p. 231-235
- Marseul, S. A. de 1880: [Haag-Ruthenberg, J. G.] L'Abeille, Nouvelles et faits divers, Deuxieme série, Paris (No. 31), p. 122-123
- Marseul, S. A. de] 1882: Les Entomologistes et leurs Écrits. L'Abeille. Journal d'entomologie. Quatrieme. série. Par. M. S.-A. de Marseul, Paris 20(=2), p. 1-60
- Marwinski, F. 1974 Beiträge zur Entomologie, Berlin 24, p. 372-373
- Musgrave, A. B. 1932: [Haag-Ruthenberg, J. G.] Bib. austr. Ent, p. 137
- Poggi, R.; Conci, C. 1996: [Haag-Rutenberg, G. J.] Memorie della Società Entomologica Italiana, Genova 75
- Scherer, G. 1992: Die Sektion Coleoptera der Zoologischen Staatssammlung München. Spixiana. Zeitschrift für Zoologie, Supplement, München 17, p. 61-71
