= Wildlife of Libya =

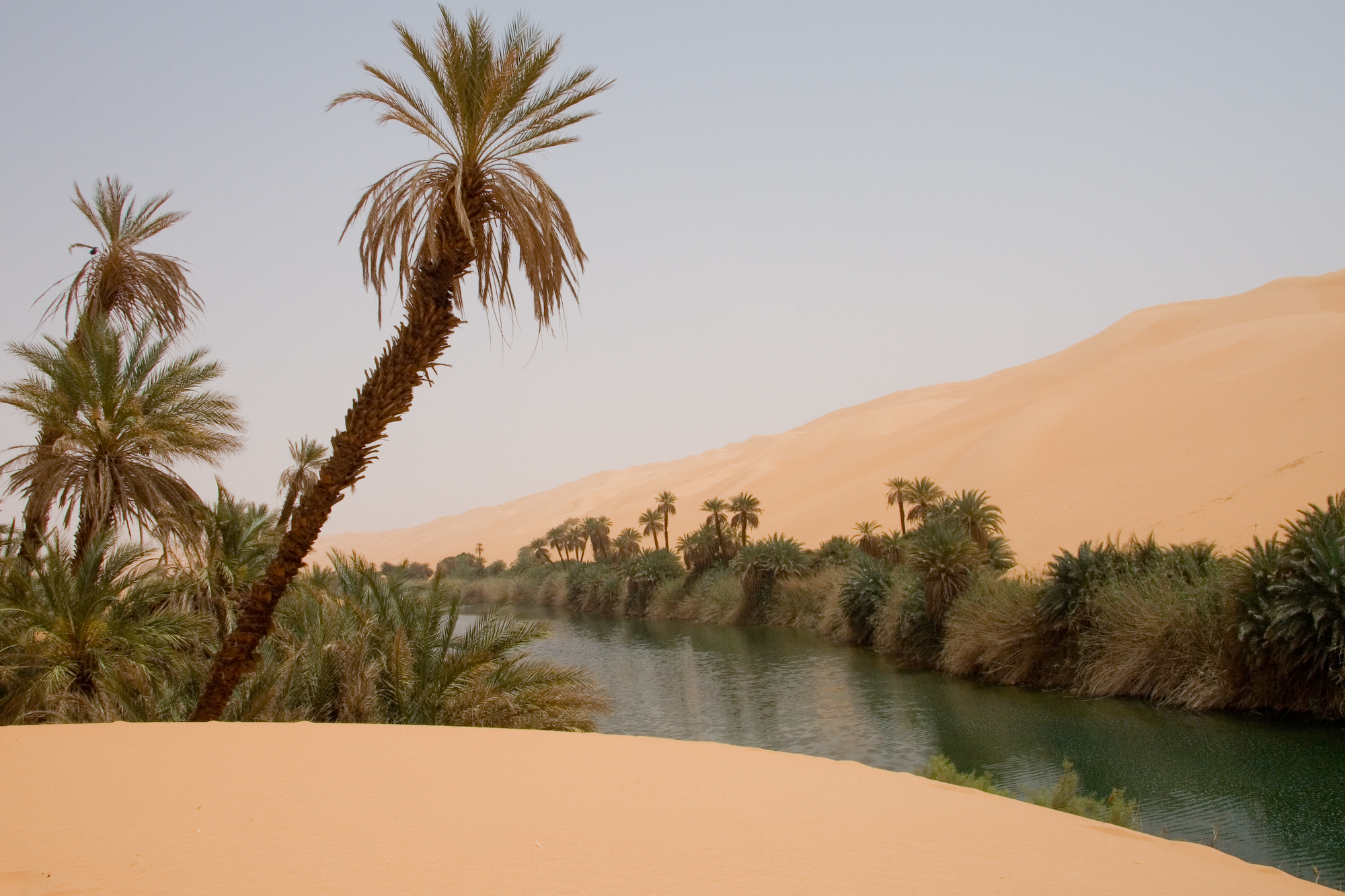
Ecoregion of Ubari oasis - with lakes in Erg Awbari (Idehan Ubari) in the Sahara Desert region of the Wadi Al Hayaa District, of the Fezzan region in southwestern Libya

The wildlife of Libya is spread over the Mediterranean coastline and encompasses large areas of the Saharan desert. The protection of wildlife is provided through appropriate legislation in seven national parks, five reserves, 24 protected areas, two wetlands under Ramsar Convention, and also in other areas. Apart from these, there are also five UNESCO World Heritage Sites related to culture. The most important national parks are the El-Kouf National Park and Karabolli National Park. The well known nature reserves are the Benghazi Reserve and the Zellaf Reserve. The wildlife species recorded in the country are 87 mammals and 338 species of birds.

Libya's natural national assets are its nearly 2,000 kilometres (1,200 mi) of coastline and the vast Sahara desert which is the semiarid and arid region to the south. Its hills, ponds and coastal habitats which comprise coral reefs, mangroves, sea grass beds, salt marshes, and mud flats add to its biodiversity. Some of the sites are important for migratory birds.

== Laws for regulation ==
National laws and international agreements are part of the preservation of biodiversity and wetland culture in the country. The Green Mountain Area is under protection to protect 5,000 kilometres (3,106.86 mi) of the mountainous areas with the Green Mountain Conservation and Development Authority. It covers the coastline of 217 kilometres (135 mi), and also the ancient historical site of Greeko-Roman Cyrene. The first conservation legislation enacted in 1949 was the Law on Forestry. The purpose of this legislation was to ensure protection to forests and forest products, and also retain soil conditions, enhance water sources availability and utilization, and to prevent desertification. In 1970, the Law for the Protection of Agricultural Land was enacted as an ordinance to protect the green areas. The first national park came into existence in November 1978. This was followed by many other national parks to preserve and conserve wild animals in the reserves where the threat was real. In 1990, the Technical Committee of Wildlife and National Parks was established exclusively to ensure proper management of the protected areas, as part of the General Secretariat of Agricultural Reclamation and Land Reform. With this setup, all protected areas are now under the management control of the Government of Libya.

== Geography ==
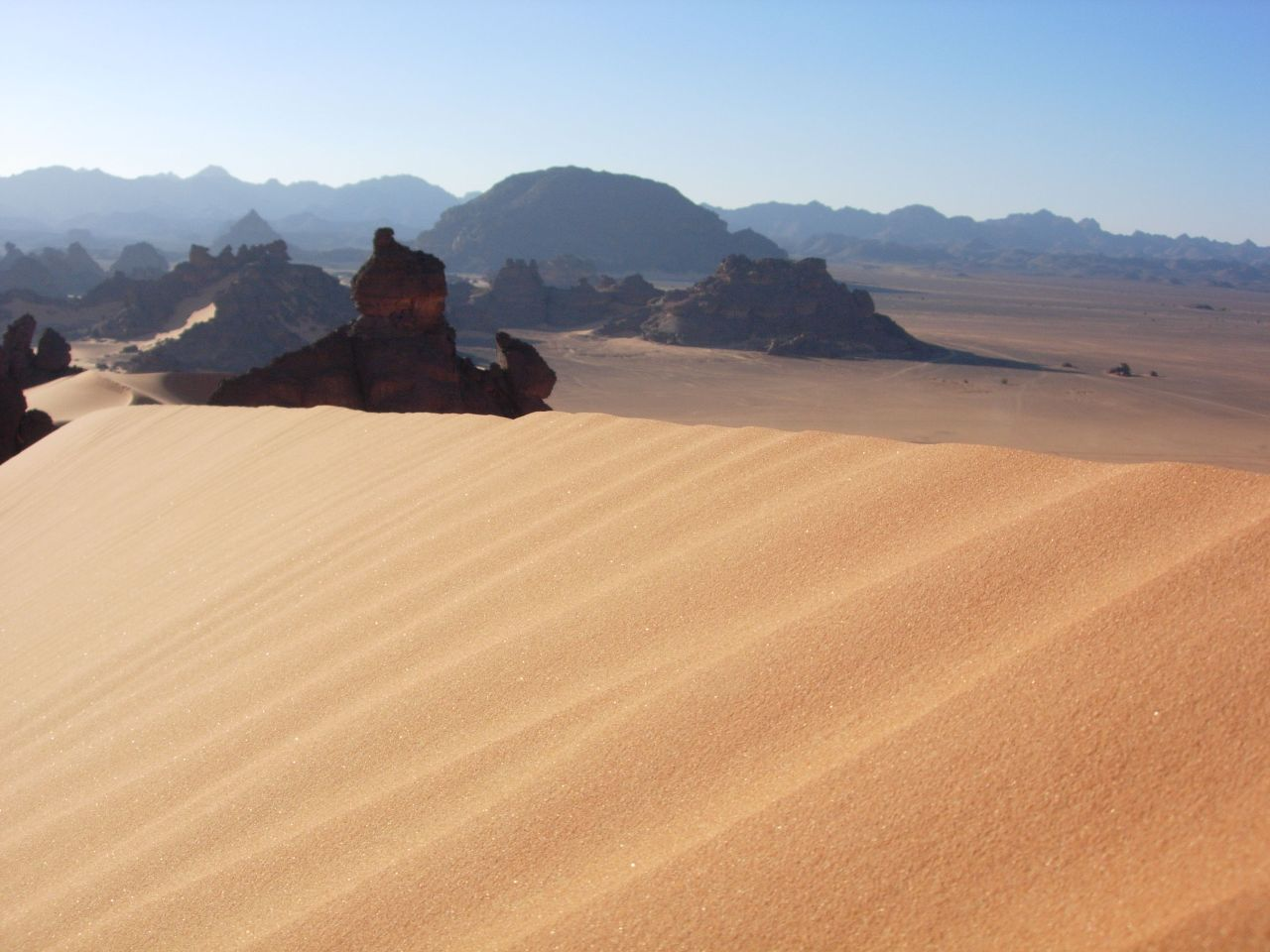
Libyan Sahara Desert

Protected areas in Libya are under four categories of national parks, protected reserves, protected areas, and wetlands, and a few others areas, which cover coastal, marine and terrestrial areas. The seven national parks are: The Abughilan National Park, the El Kouf National Park, the Karabolli National Park, the Naggaza National Park, the Rajma National Park and the Sirman National Park of which Karabolli and Kouf cover the coastal and marine areas. The five nature reserves are: The Benghazi Reserve, the Bier Ayyad Reserve, the New Hiesha Natural Reserve, the Tripoli Reserve and the Zellaf Reserve. There are 24 protected areas: Ain Zayanah, Ajdabiya Marsh, Al Jaghbub Oasis, Berjuj Valley, Bombe gulf, Fezzan valleys, Garabulli, Giarabub, Grotto de Lete, Harouj Mountain, Jalo, Kufrah Oasis, Nefhusa, Oasis of Ghat, Ouau en Namu lakes, Qaminis and Tukrah salines, Rajma plantations, Sabratha, Sebkha el Sahel, Serir, Shahaat, Taizerbo, Taoulga islands (Thaouara), and Wadi Kham. The wetlands designated under Ramsar Convention are the Ain Elshakika Wetland and the Ain Elzarga Wetland. According to the list of ecoregions classified by the World Wide Fund for Nature (WWF), Libya is inscribed under the eco-regions of Palearctic Mediterranean Forests, Woodlands and Scrub, and Mediterranean Sea.

The coast line of Libya, which extends over a length of 2,000 kilometres (1,200 mi) is also a live house of the rich and unique, and globally important biodiversity of the Mediterranean zone.

== National parks ==
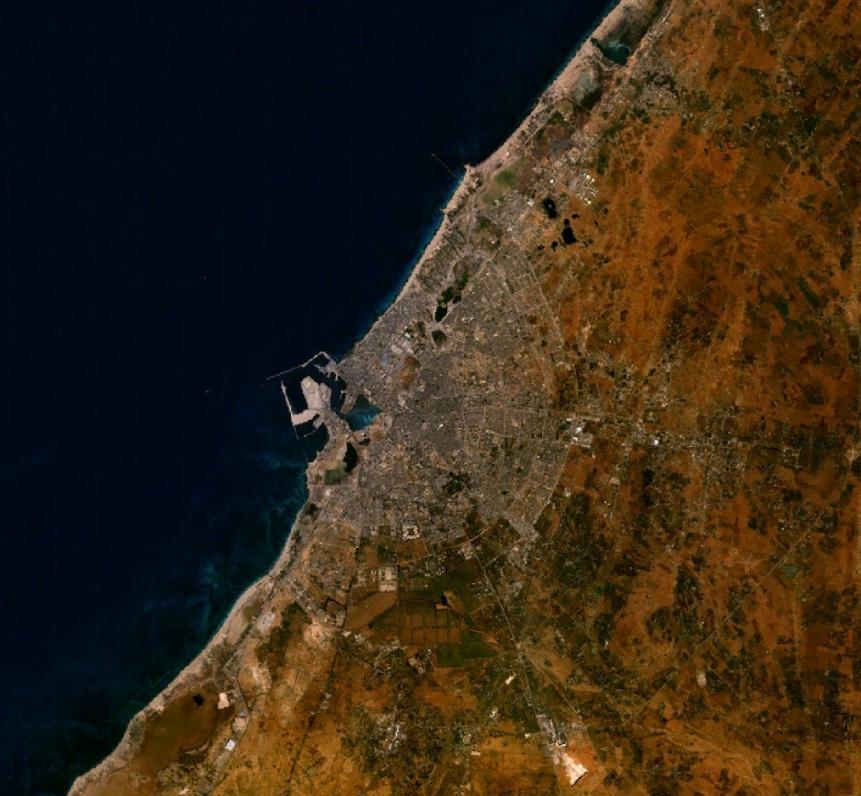
Coastline environment of Benghazi

The Algharabolli National Park, established in 1992, covers an area of 8,000 hectares (20,000 acres). The Abughilan National Park, which encompasses an area of 4,000 hectares (9,900 acres), was established in 1992. The El-Kouf National Park, established in 1975, covers a land area of 35,000 hectares (86,000 acres) with coastal line of 20 kilometres (12 mi); the total conservation area, however, is 100,000 hectares (250,000 acres) including the large basin area of Wade El Kouf. The area is bounded by Jabel Al-Akhdar Mountain (elevation 860 metres (2,820 ft) and of limestone formation) forming a rectangular area bordered by the coast line of the Mediterranean Sea. It is 150 kilometres (93 mi) north-east of Benghazi, near Al Bayda (Beida) town. The El Naggaza National Park was established in 1993 covering an area of 4,000 hectares (9,900 acres). The Karabolli National Park, located in the north-west part of Libya, was established in 1992. It covers an area of 8,000 hectares (20,000 acres). The nearest town to the park is Al Garabulli. Tripoli is to its west, about 50 kilometres (31 mi) away. Many streams with spring as their source drain the park area. The park habitat is made up of sand dunes, beaches, cliffs and salt lagoons. It was identified as Bird Life Sanctuary in 1992, and hosts 100 species of birds. The Sabrata National Park was established in 1995 covering an area of 500 hectares (1,200 acres). The Surman National Park covers an area of 400 hectares (990 acres), and was established in 1992.

== Nature reserves ==
There are five nature reserves in Libya. These are: the Alhesha Nature Reserve, which was established in 1984, covers an area of 160,000 hectares (400,000 acres); the Bier Ayyad Nature Reserve covers an area of 12,000 hectares (30,000 acres) and was established in 1992; the Msalata Nature Reserve established in 1998 has an area of 1,800 hectares (4,400 acres); the Nalout Nature Reserve covers 200 hectares (490 acres) and was established in 1998; and the Zulton Nature Reserve created in 1998 encompasses an area of 1,000 hectares (2,500 acres).

== Wetlands ==
There are two wetlands of international importance inscribed under the Ramsar Convention. These are:

The Ain Elshakika Wetland, which covers an area of 33 hectares (82 acres), was included in the Ramsar Convention on Wetlands on 5 April 2000. It also covers part of the Kouf National Park. It is a hypersaline coastal sebkha (sebka means: "depression"). The geological formation, on its southern part, consists of limestone. Sand dunes, mudflats and large areas of shrubs are also part of this wetland. Its importance is on account of migratory and resident waterbirds, which provide ample opportunities for bird watching and also for eco-tourism.

The Ain Elzarga Wetland was designated as a Ramsar Site on 5 April 2000 and it covers an area of 50 hectares (120 acres). Its small coastal depression has link with the sea and hence water is visible in the wetland throughout the year, though saline particularly in summer. This land of marshes and mud flats is bounded on the south and east by rocky hills and sand dunes. It runs from east to west. It is part of the Kouf National Park and is important on account of the large population of migratory birds. Its potential for bird watching is also of eco-tourism interest.

== Wildlife ==
The Libyan coast line of 2,000 kilometres (1,200 mi) is rich in flora and fauna; the interior region including the Sahara Desert Region is also fairly rich in flora and fauna.

=== Flora ===
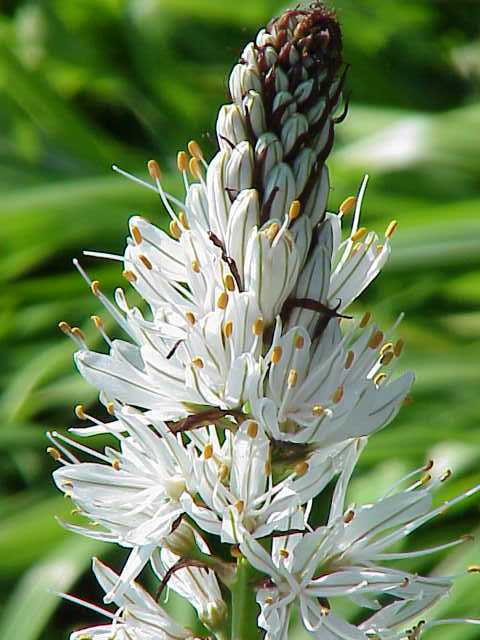
Asphodelus albus

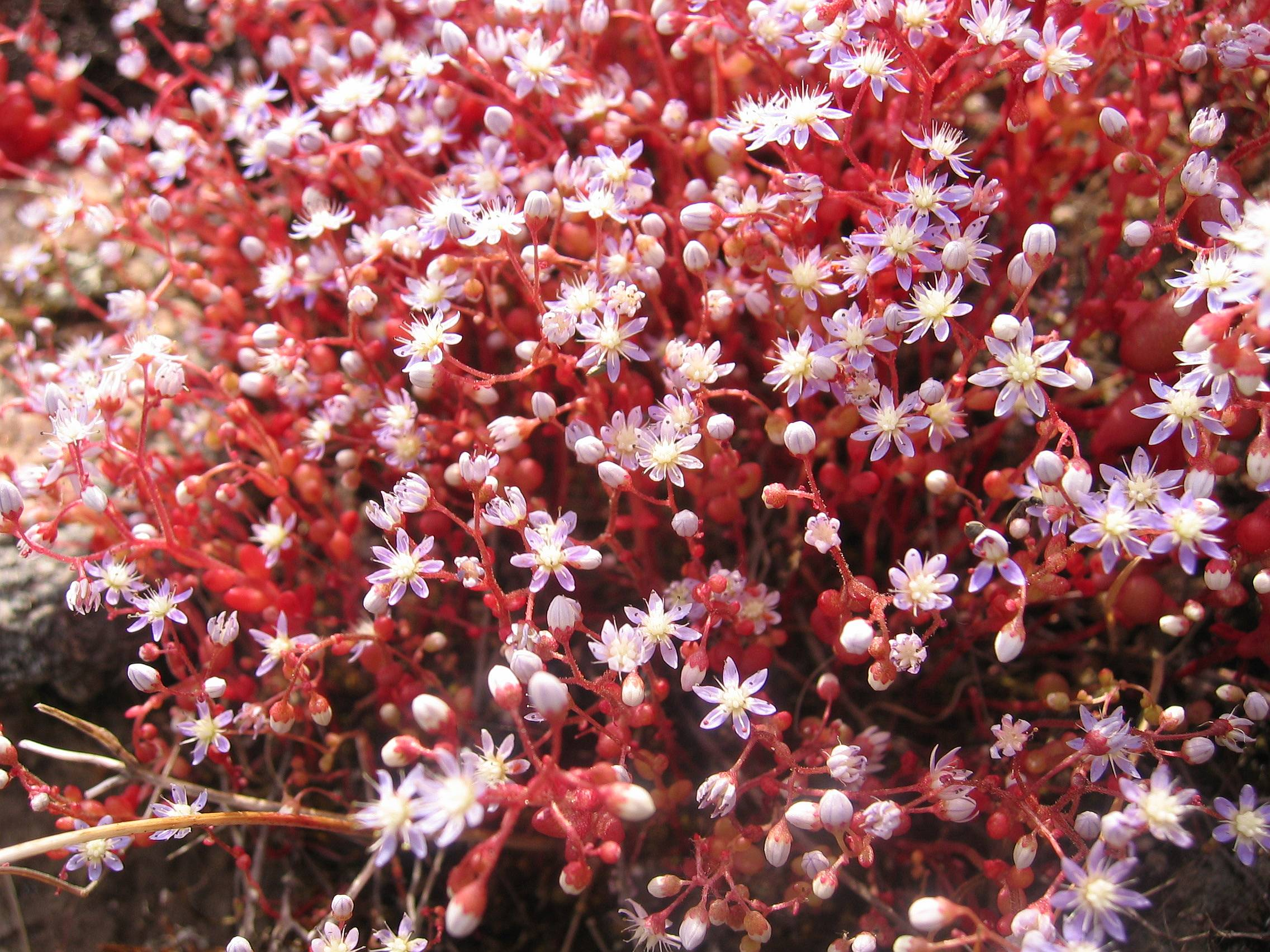
Sedum caeruleum

The plants found in the coastal zone are mostly herbaceous with abundance of grasses. The most recorded species are the asphodel (a herb of family of lily), bougainvillea and oleander. There are also many plants under cultivation such as citrus and olive. There is a narrow buffer zone along the coast where agriculture is practiced. This zone also has grass lands. Moving away from the coast, the topography changes to the Green Mountains (Libya), which rises to a height of about 800 metres (2,600 ft). Influenced by the Mediterranean climate, the region has dense forest or maquis of juniper and lentisc trees, and also brome grass, canary grass, bluegrass, and rye grass. Since rainfall in the area is scanty, the cultivated trees consists of figs and olives. In the Nafusah Plateau, grasslands form the dominant vegetation. Moving towards south of the mountain range, Sahara desert environment dominates the region with limited cultivation of palm and fig trees around springs and natural oases. Date palms (near the oases), saltwort (used for making soda ash), spurge flax shrub, goosefoot, wormwood, and asphodel, cyrenaica are also reported in the wild. Sea grass meadows are reported to cover 1,500 kilometres (932.06 mi) between the Gulf of Sirte in Libya and the Gulf of Gabes in Tunisia.

There are nearly 134 vascular plant species which are specific to Libya. These include:

- Cyclamen rohlfsianum
- Arbutus pavarii
- Sedum
- Anacamptis cyrenaica, an orchid
- Echinops cyrenaicus
- Linaria tarhunensis
- Pallenis cyrenaica
- Allium negrianum
- Silene cyrenaica
- Hypericum tauberti
- Cynara cyrenaica
- Poa pentapolitana
- Romulea cyrenaica
- Satureja
- Anathallis linearifolia
- Nepeta cyrenaica
- Crocus boulosii
- Euphorbia pseudoapios
- Limonium teuchirae
- Asperula tragacanthoides
- Orobanche cyrenaica
- Pachyctenium
- Libyella

The last two plant genera listed above are endemic.

=== Fauna ===
==== Mammals ====
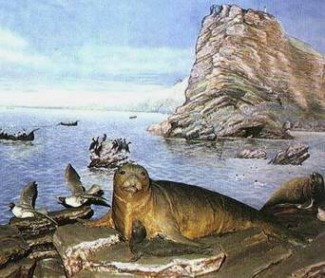
A Mediterranean monk seal by Grigore Antipa (1940)

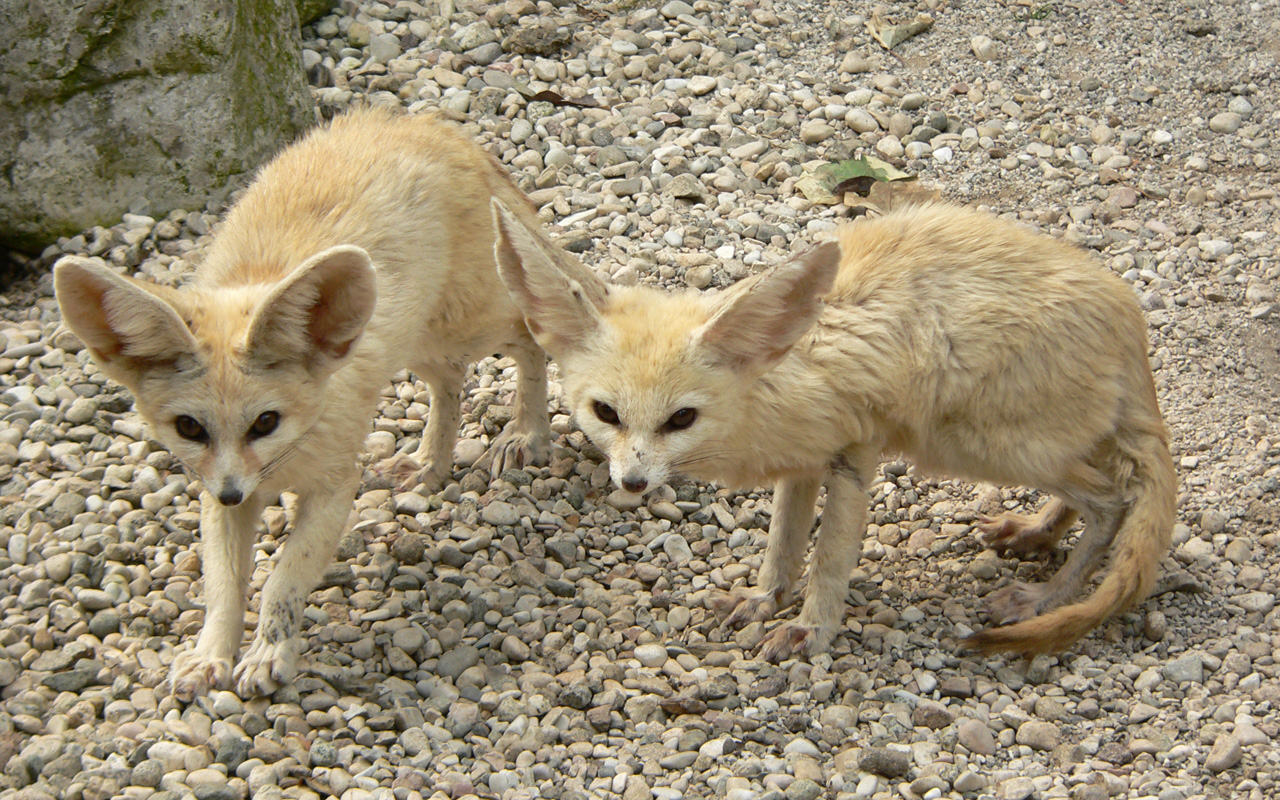
Fennecs (Vulpes zerda)

Along the coast, the Mediterranean monk seal is a well known species. It has been listed in the IUCN Red List as critically endangered in Libya. In the Jbel Acacus region, from the rock art work of animal forms seen in the far southwest of the country, it is inferred that African elephants, giraffes and rhinos inhabited the area in the past during the ice age when the land was fertile. Now, very few animals, like the striped hyenas (Hyaena hyaena), fennec fox, gazelles, African wildcats and golden wolves live in the area. The cheetah is now extinct from the area. Reptiles and rodents are common in the sands of the desert. Red shrimp are reported from the Ubari Lakes in the Fezan area. The faunal species recorded include Canis anthus, Vulpes vulpes, Genetta genetta, Felis libyca, Hystrix cristata, Delphinus delphis and Tursiops truncatus.

Mammals and reptiles found in Libya which are on the IUCN Red List are: Grobben's gerbil, the Alexandrian shrew and the orangetail lizard (Philochortus zolii).

Apart from the above, the mammal species identified in the reference book Mammal Species of the World are:

- Grobben's gerbil (Gerbillus grobbeni)
- Sand gerbil (Gerbillus syrticus)
- Tarabul's gerbil (Gerbillus tarabuli)
- Pleasant gerbil (Gerbillus amoenus)
- Thin sand rat (Psammomys vexillaris)
- Common gundi (Ctenodactylus gundi)
- Val's gundi (Ctenodactylus vali)
- Kuhl's pipistrelle (Pipistrellus kuhlii)
- Saharan striped polecat (Ictonyx libycus)
- Dromedary (Camelus dromedarius)
- North African elephant shrew (Petrosaltator rozeti)
- Rock hyrax (Procavia capensis)
- Asian garden dormouse (Eliomys melanurus)
- Maghreb garden dormouse (Eliomys munbyanus)
- Four-toed jerboa (Scarturus tetradactyla)
- Lesser Egyptian jerboa (Jaculus jaculus)
- Greater Egyptian jerboa (Jaculus orientalis)
- Günther's vole (Microtus guentheri)
- Cairo spiny mouse (Acomys cahirinus)
- Lesser short-tailed gerbil (Dipodillus simoni)
- Anderson's gerbil (Gerbillus andersoni)
- Lataste's gerbil (Gerbillus latastei)
- Shaw's jird (Meriones shawi)
- Algerian mouse (Mus spretus)
- Mzab gundi (Massoutiera mzabi)
- North African hedgehog (Atelerix algirus)
- Long-eared hedgehog (Hemiechinus auritus)
- Geoffroy's horseshoe bat (Rhinolophus clivosus)
- Mehely's horseshoe bat (Rhinolophus mehelyi)
- European free-tailed bat (Tadarida teniotis)
- Greater noctule bat (Nyctalus lasiopterus)
- Soprano pipistrelle (Pipistrellus pygmaeus)
- Desert long-eared bat (Otonycteris hemprichii)
- Felten's myotis (Myotis punicus)
- Fennec fox (Vulpes zerda)
- Hartebeest (Alcelaphus buselaphus)
- Cuvier's gazelle (Gazella cuvieri)
- Dorcas gazelle (Gazella dorcas)
- Rhim gazelle (Gazella leptoceros)
- Barbary sheep (Ammotragus lervia)
- Addax (Addax nasomaculatus)
- Scimitar oryx (Oryx dammah)
- North African gerbil (Dipodillus campestris)
- Lesser Egyptian gerbil (Gerbillus gerbillus)
- Pygmy gerbil (Gerbillus henleyi)
- Balochistan gerbil (Gerbillus nanus)
- Sundevall's jird (Meriones crassus)
- Libyan jird (Meriones libycus)
- Lesser noctule (Nyctalus leisleri)
- Lesser mouse-tailed bat (Rhinopoma hardwickii)

===== Rodents =====
The rodents reported are: Pachyuromys duprasi (fat-tailed gerbil), Meriones libycus (Libyan jird), Ctenodactylus gundi (gundi), Meriones crassus (Sundevall's jird), Meriones crassus (Sundevall's jird), Spalacidae (blind mole-rat, common mole-rats, zokors, and bamboo rats), Elephantulus rozeti (North African elephant shrew), Spalacinae (blind mole-rats), Arvicolinae (lemmings and voles), Jaculus orientalis (greater Egyptian jerboa), Massoutiera mzabi (Mzab gundi), and Spalax ehrenbergi (Middle East blind mole-rat).

==== Birds ====
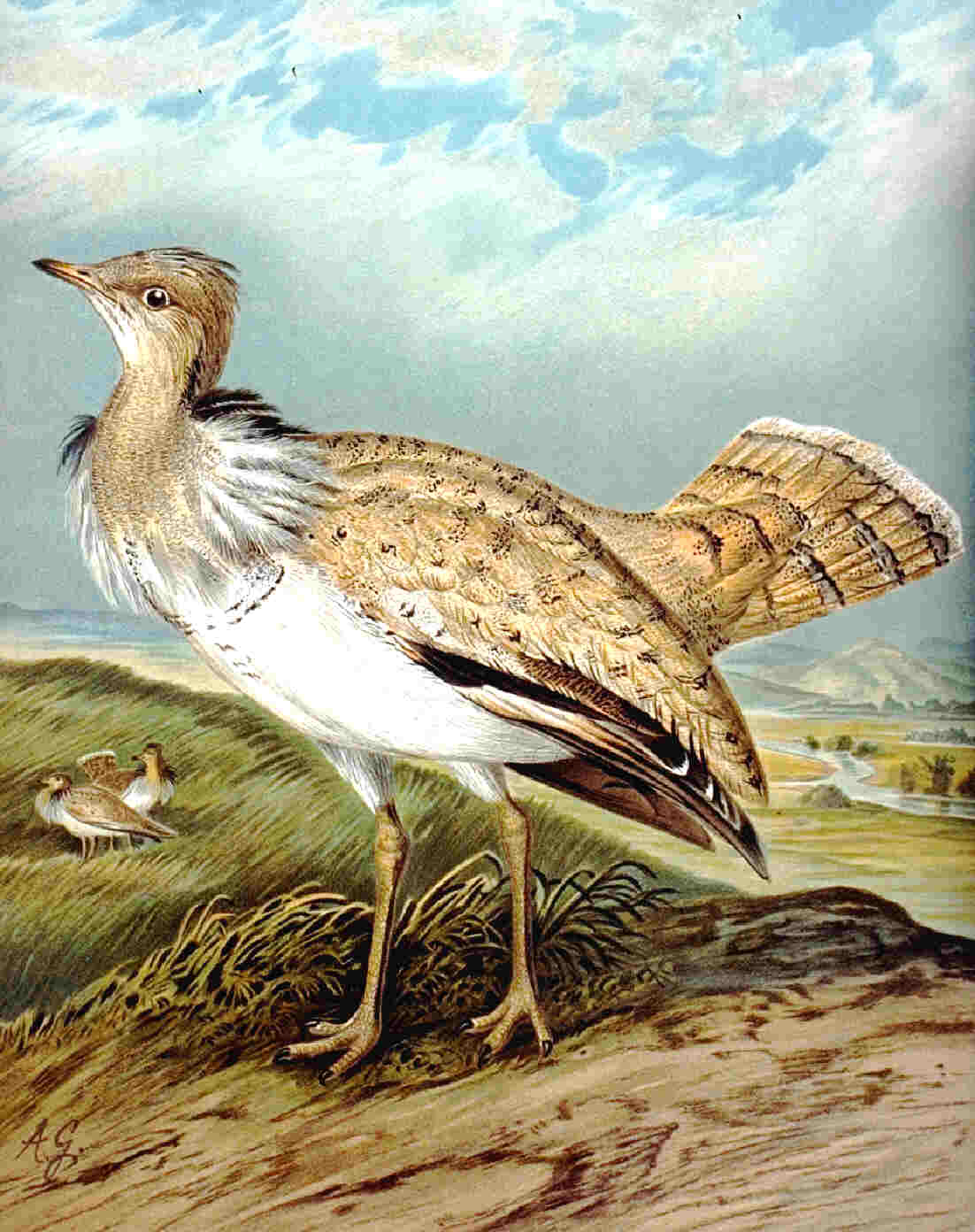
A houbara bustard (Chlamydotis undulata) from Johann Friedrich Naumann's Natural History of the Birds of Central Europe, Volume VII, seventh panel Gera, 1899

In the coastal belt, bird species recorded are greater flamingo on the beaches, and also many birds of prey. Migratory birds pass through Libya, and are seen mostly along the coastline. The most notable ones are the flamingo, Kentish plover in the Bengazi Reserve. Houbara bustard and the European white stork are reported in the Kouf National Park and in the beaches and lagoons. In the oases, desert larks, desert sparrows, and spotted sandgrouse have been reported. Other notable species reported are Aquila chrysaetos, Alectoris barbara, Pterocles species and Chlamydotis undulata with herons, ducks, waders, Ciconia nigra, Ciconia ciconia, and Milvus milvus (red kite) from the brackish lagoons.

==== Invertebrates ====
Invertebrates exclusive to Libya are:

- Chlorophorus ringenbachi, a longhorned beetle
- Caulostrophus ringenbachi, a weevil
- Paratassa ringenbachi, a jewel beetle
- Neolaphyra ritchiei, a tiger beetle
- Pachydema peyerhimhoffi, a cockchafer
- Onitis ringenbachi, a dung beetle
- Tentyria cyrenaica, a darkling beetle
- Mylabris cyrenaica, a blister beetle
- Dictyophara merjensis, a planthopper
- Wadkufia elegans, a leafhopper
- Bees
  - Nomioides mucoreus
  - Lasioglossum tripolitanum
- Buthus barcaeus, a scorpion
- Glomeris monostriata, a millipede found in caves
- Land snails
  - Barcania kaltenbachi
  - Cochlostoma susaense

===== Molluscs =====
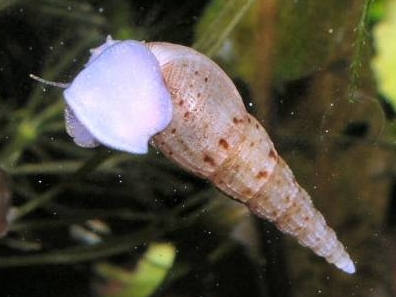
Red-rimmed melania (Melanoides tuberculata)

Some of the 'non-marine molluscs of Libya, which are a part of the molluscan fauna of Libya, are, Melanoides tuberculata (O. F. Müller, 1774) listed under IUCN as of least concern, Parmacella festae (Gambetta, 1925 - northern Libya), and Parmacella olivieri (Cuvier, 1804 - northern Libya).

==== Marine fauna ====
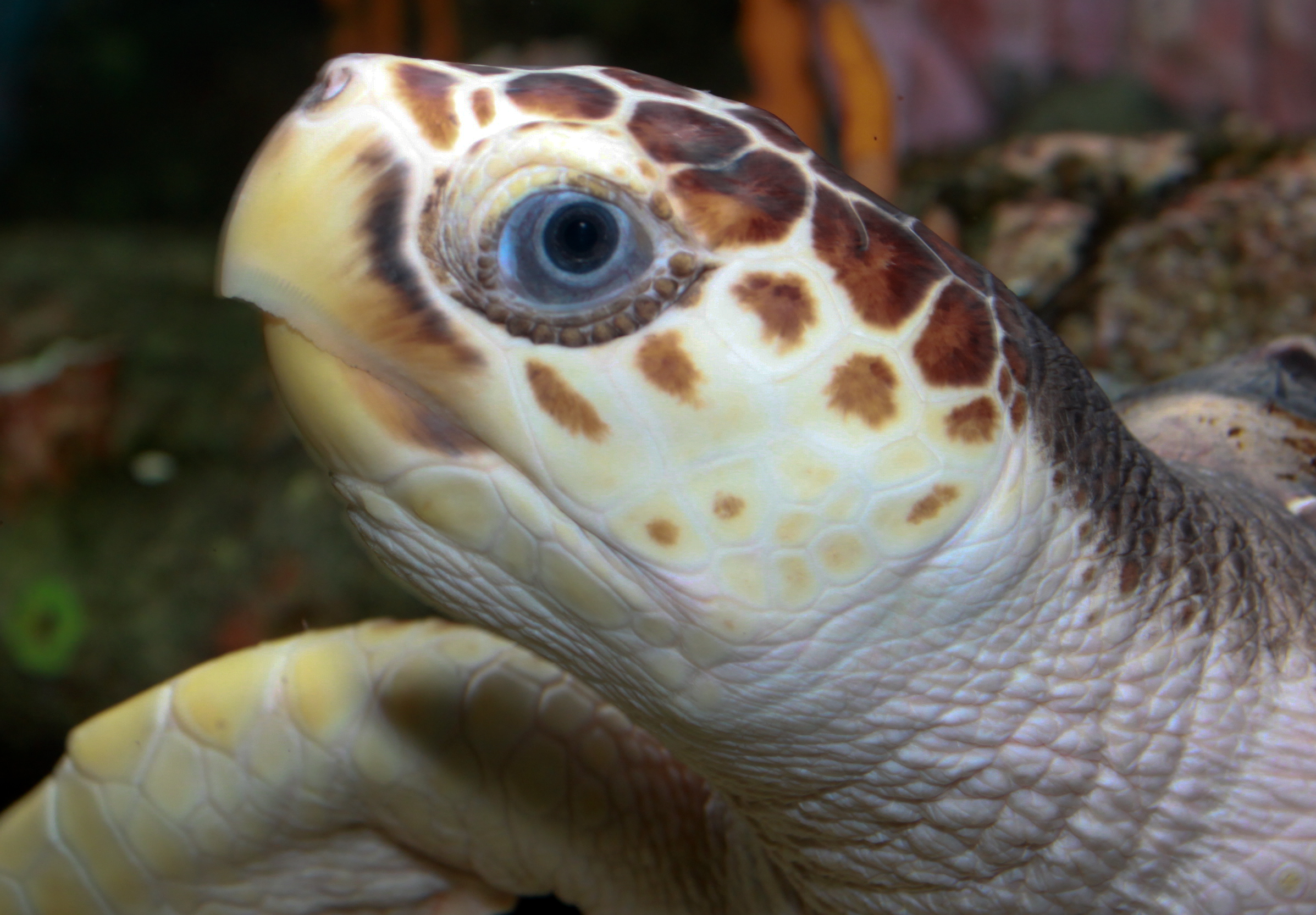
Loggerhead sea turtle (Caretta caretta)

The Libyan coast is rich in fish production and many edible marine organisms. The Marine Biology Research Centre (MBRC) facilitated selection of coastal areas under Marine Protected Areas (MPAs). The key MPAs established were the El Kouf National Park, Ain Gazala Farwa, El Burdi, and Ain -Ziyana. Reported marine mammal species include the monk seal Monachus monachus (CR) on the coast, and Tursiops truncatus offshore.

The coastal area and the Mediterranean Sea is reported as the nesting areas for the loggerhead turtle (Caretta caretta), and juveniles of bluefin tuna (Thunnus thynnus), nearing extinction. The killifish (Aphanius desioi) is an IUCN Red List species.

== Conservation ==
The threats faced by the national parks, reserves and protected areas have been identified. These are due to excessive logging operations, poaching of birds, unauthorised felling of trees, alteration of the habitat status due to pollution, land use, climate change, and inadequate management measures.

The measures under implementation to address the threats identified in the protected areas are in the form of protecting the ecosystems and biodiversity, conducting scientific research in identified areas, creating public awareness, ensuring sustainability of resources, promote ecotourism, creation of protected areas conforming to different ecosystems, and setting up of adequate management mechanism.

== Bibliography ==
- "Animal Diversity Web". University of Michigan Museum of Zoology. 1995–2006.
- Lepage, Denis. "Checklist of birds of Libya". Bird Checklists of the World. Avibase. Archived from the original on 30 September 2007.
- Clements, James F. (2000). Birds of the World: a Checklist. Cornell University Press. p. 880. ISBN 0-934797-16-1.
