= Protected areas of Libya =

Protected areas of Libya include any geographical area protected for a specific use.

Most protected areas are intended for the conservation of flora and fauna. Libya's national parks and nature reserves are maintained by the "Technical Committee of Wildlife and National Parks" which was created in 1990, as part of the General Secretariat of Agricultural Reclamation and Land Reform.

Areas may also be protected for their value and importance as historical, cultural heritage or scientific sites. More information on these can be found in the list of heritage sites in Libya.

There were no national parks or protected areas in Libya prior to the Libyan coup of 1969. The new revolutionary government began to designate national parks and nature reserves in the 1970s. By 2009 seven national parks, five nature reserves and twenty-four other protected areas had been established, mostly along the coast of the Mediterranean Sea. Among the most visited of these areas are Karaboli National Park, El-Kouf National Park, Benghazi Nature Reserve, and Tripoli Nature Reserve along the coast, and Zellaf Nature Reserve in the southwestern desert.

== Benghazi Nature Reserve ==
The Benghazi Nature Reserve is located north of the city of Benghazi about 14 km on the Mediterranean coast. Known for its migratory waterbirds, the reserve includes a stretch of beach dunes and salt marshes, as well as the Ayn Zayanah Lagoon. The lagoon is fed by a number of freshwater springs and flamingos winter over there. Despite its protected status, the area is also used for fishing and recreation. In a number of places garbage has been illegally dumped in the reserve.

== El Kouf National Park ==
El Kouf National Park is located near and to the west of the city of Bayda, in Jabal al Akhdar District in the forested hills of the Jebel Akhdar or Green Mountains. The park is only about 15 km wide from east and west, but it stretches from the coast for a 160 km to the south, following the course of Wadi el-Kouf. There are three major habitat types, beach dunes give way to maquis shrubland at higher elevations, with a fluvial microhabitat along the course of the wadi. The park protects both marine and land wildlife. Noted species include bottlenose dolphins, golden wolves, striped hyenas and small-spotted genets. The landscape includes cliffs and caves.

== National parks ==
| Name | Area (km²) | Created | District | Notes |
|---|---|---|---|---|
| Abughilan National Park | 40 | 1992 | Jabal al Gharbi District | |
| El-Kouf National Park | 80 | 1978 | Jabal al Akhdar District | |
| Karabolli National Park | 80 | 1992 | Tripoli District (Tarabulus) | |
| El Naggaza National Park | 40 | 1993 | Murqub District | |
| Rajma National Park | ? | | Jabal al Gharbi District | |
| Sirman National Park (Surman) | 4 | 1992 | Zawiya District | |

== Nature reserves ==
- Benghazi Nature Reserve
- Bier Ayyad Nature Reserve
- New Hiesha Natural Reserve
- Tripoli Nature Reserve
- Zellaf Nature Reserve

== Other protected areas ==
- Ain Zayanah
- Ajdabiya Marsh
- Al Jaghbub Oasis
- Belkarra-Boulelli
- Berjuj Valley
- Bombe gulf
- Fezzan valleys
- Garabulli
- Giarabub
- Grotto de Lete
- Harouj Mountain
- Jalo Oasis
- Kufrah Oasis
- Nefhusa
- Oasis of Ghat
- Qaminis and Tukrah salines
- Rajma plantations
- Sabratha
- Sebkha el Sahel
- Serir
- Shahaat
- Taizerbo
- Taoulga islands (Thaouara)
- Wadi Kham

== Ramsar wetlands ==
- Ain Elshakika
- Ain Elzarga
