= List of wadis of Libya =

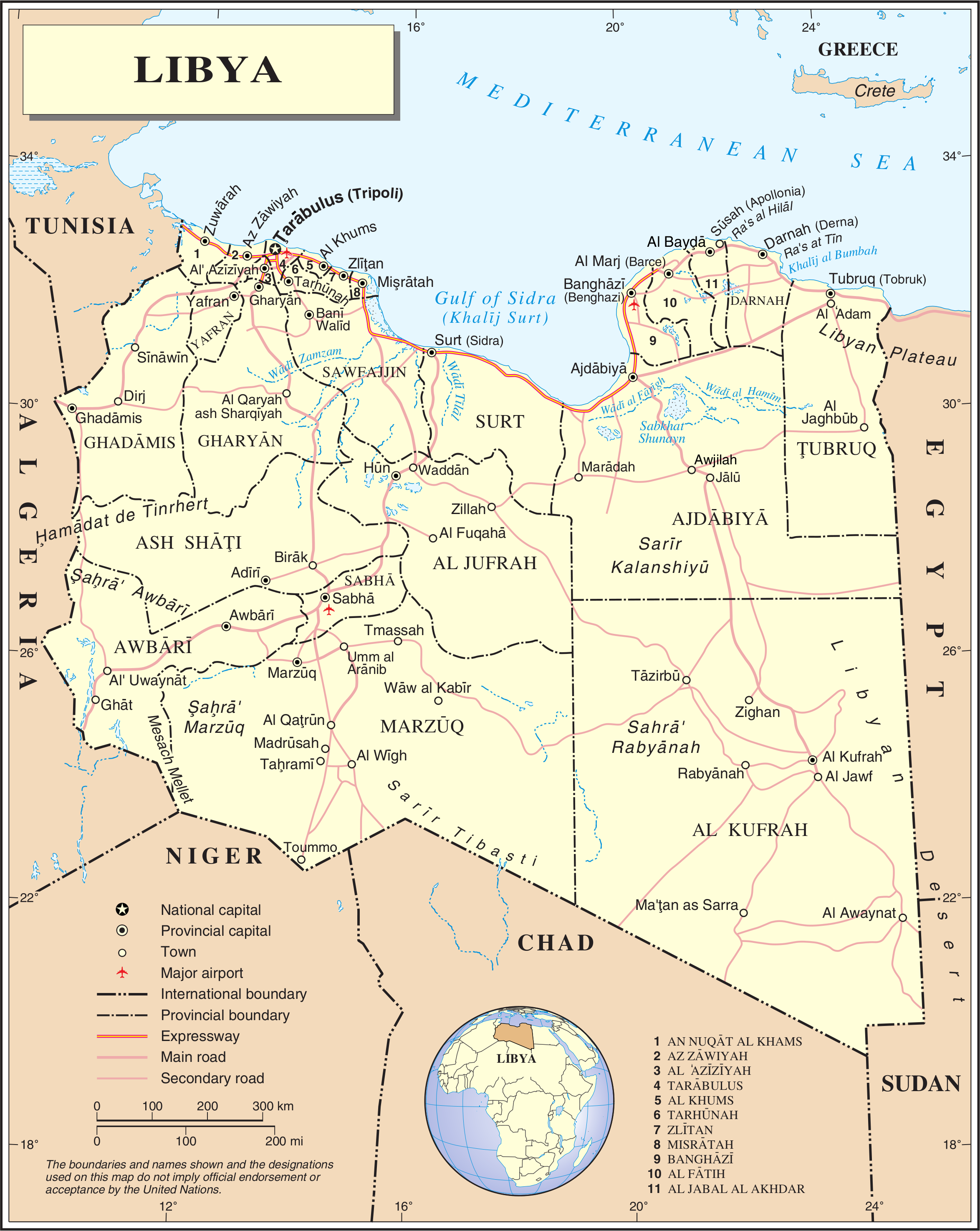
Map of Libya with some of the most important wadis.

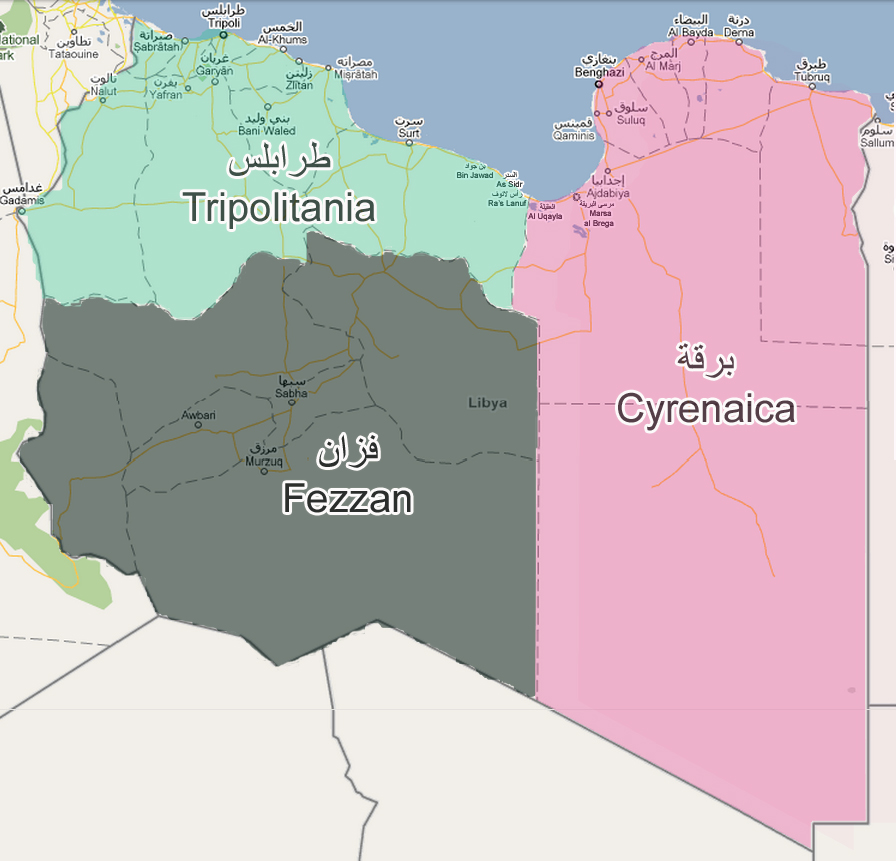
Map of Libya's regions: Tripolitania, Fezzan and Cyrenaica.

This is a list of wadis in Libya. This list is arranged by region from west to east, with respective tributaries indented under each larger stream's name.

== Tripolitania ==
- Wadi Awwal
- Wadi Tanarut
- Wadi Maymun
- Wadi Majer - near Zliten
- Wadi al Mujaynin
- Wadi Turghut (west)
- Wadi al Masid
- Wadi Turghut (east)
- Wadi Labdah
- Wadi Ki'am (Wadi Targhalat) - Libya's only perennial stream
- Wadi Sawfajjin
- Wadi Zamzam
- Wadi Bey al Kabir
- Wadi Thamit
- Wadi Jarif
- Wadi Tilal
- Wadi ar Rijl (Wadi Matratin)

== Fezzan ==
- Wadi Tanezzuft
- Wadi Barjuj
- Wadi ash Shati
- Wadi Umm al Ara'is
- Wasi an Nashu

== Cyrenaica ==
- Wadi al Qattarah
- Wadi Darnah
- Wadi al Khalij
- Wadi Husayn
- Wadi al Mu'allaq
- Wadi at Tamimi
- Wadi al Farigh
- Wadi al Hamim

== See also ==
- Great Manmade River
