= Fezzan (disambiguation) =

Fezzan refers to:

- Fezzan (region), a historic region of Libya
- Fezzan Basin
- Fezzan-Ghadames Military Territory
- Fezzan valleys
- Fezzan province
