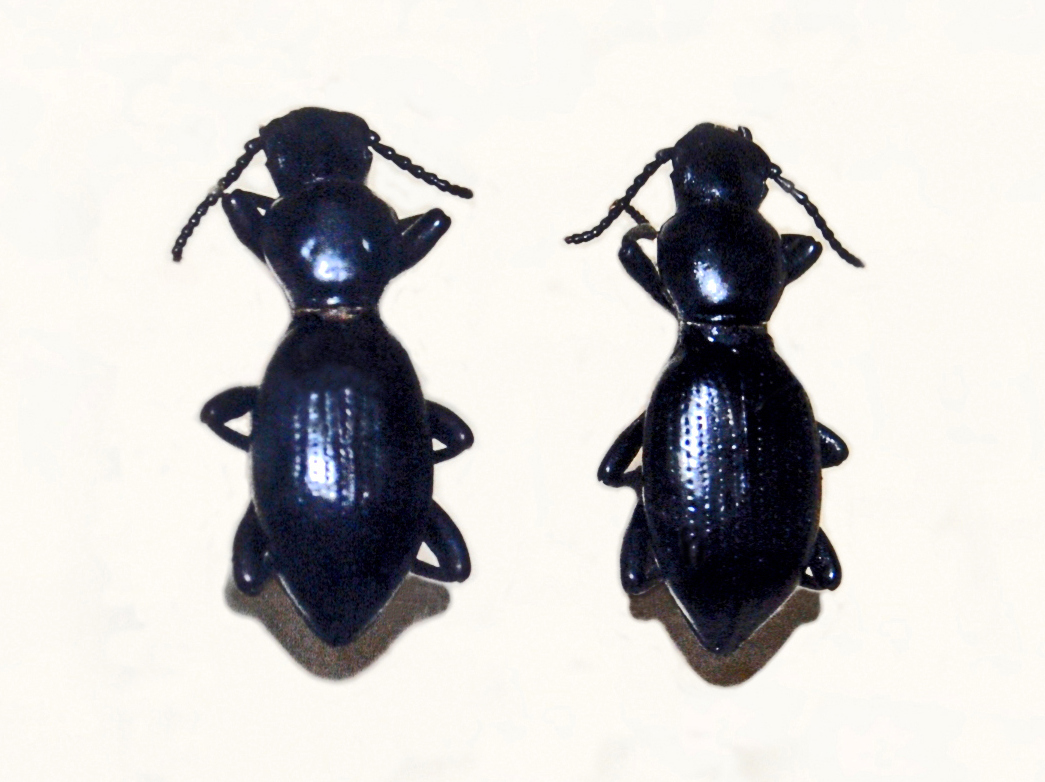
- Mesostena puncticollis

Scientific classification
- Kingdom: Animalia
- Phylum: Arthropoda
- Clade: Pancrustacea
- Class: Insecta
- Order: Coleoptera
- Suborder: Polyphaga
- Infraorder: Cucujiformia
- Family: Tenebrionidae
- Subfamily: Pimeliinae
- Tribe: Tentyriini
- Genus: Mesostena; Eschscholtz, 1831

= Mesostena =

Genus of beetles

Mesostena is a genus of darkling beetles in the subfamily Pimeliinae.

== Selected species ==
- Mesostena angustata
- Mesostena gracilis
- Mesostena longicollis
- Mesostena longicornis
- Mesostena picea
- Mesostena puncticollis
