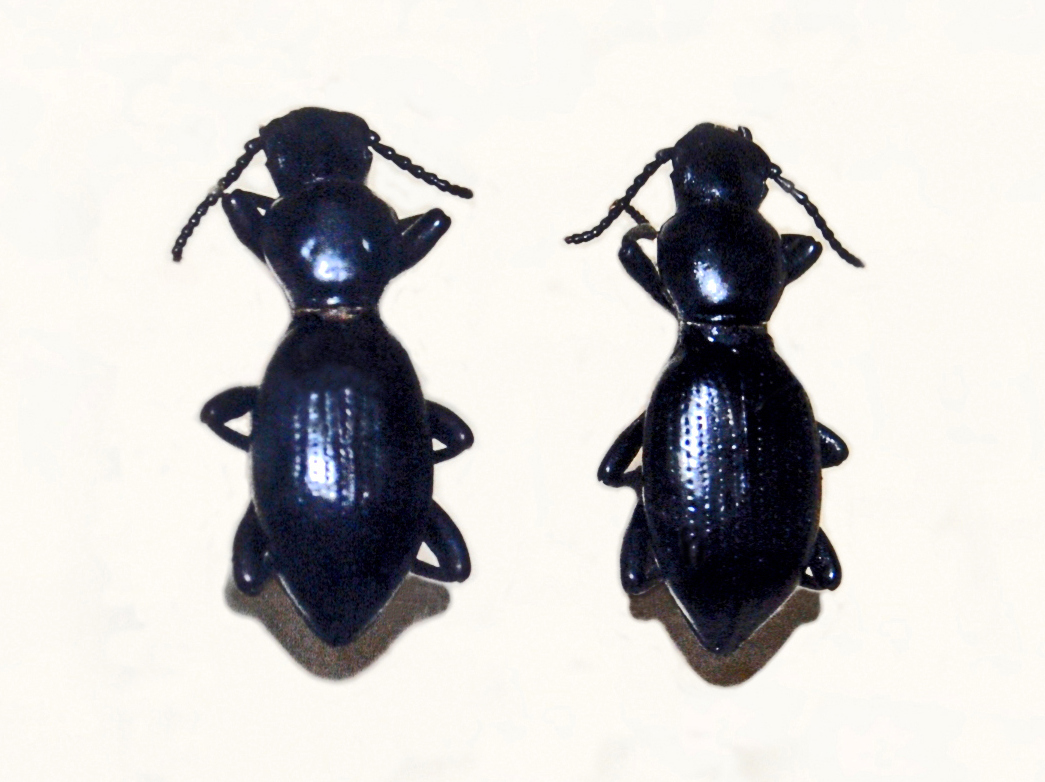
- Mesostena puncticollis from Egypt

Scientific classification
- Domain: Eukaryota
- Kingdom: Animalia
- Phylum: Arthropoda
- Class: Insecta
- Order: Coleoptera
- Suborder: Polyphaga
- Infraorder: Cucujiformia
- Family: Tenebrionidae
- Genus: Mesostena
- Species: M. puncticollis

Binomial name
- Mesostena puncticollis Solier, 1835

= Mesostena puncticollis =

Species of beetle

Mesostena puncticollis, the opossum beetle, is a species of darkling beetles in the subfamily Pimeliinae.

== Description ==
Mesostena puncticollis can reach a length of about 12 millimetres (0.47 in). Head, thorax and elytra are black, while ventral surface is reddish brown. Pronotum is goblet-shaped, elytra are elongated-elliptical, with large spots on the spotting-rows.

== Distribution and habitat ==
This species is present in Turkey, Saudi Arabia, Egypt, Jordan, Syria, Iraq and Iran.
