= Paivaea =

Scientific classification
- Kingdom: Animalia
- Phylum: Arthropoda
- Clade: Pancrustacea
- Class: Insecta
- Order: Coleoptera
- Suborder: Polyphaga
- Infraorder: Cucujiformia
- Family: Tenebrionidae
- Tribe: Tentyriini
- Genus: Paivaea; Wollaston, 1864
- Species: P. hispida

Binomial name
- Paivaea hispida (Brulle, 1838)

Synonyms
- Tentyria hispida Brulle, 1838

Genus of beetles

Paivaea is a genus of darkling beetles in the family Tenebrionidae. There is one described species in Paivaea, P. hispida.
