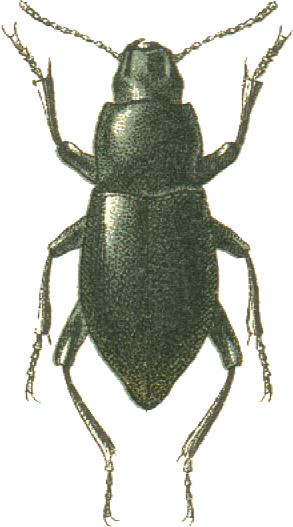
- Colposcelis longicollis

Scientific classification
- Kingdom: Animalia
- Phylum: Arthropoda
- Class: Insecta
- Order: Coleoptera
- Suborder: Polyphaga
- Infraorder: Cucujiformia
- Family: Tenebrionidae
- Tribe: Tentyriini
- Genus: Colposcelis; Dejean, 1834

Type species
- Tentyria longicollis Zubkov, 1833

Species
- Several, including: Colposcelis elegans; Colposcelis longicollis

= Colposcelis =

Genus of beetles

Colposcelis is a genus of darkling beetles in the subfamily Pimeliinae. Species have a palaearctic distribution in Asia.
