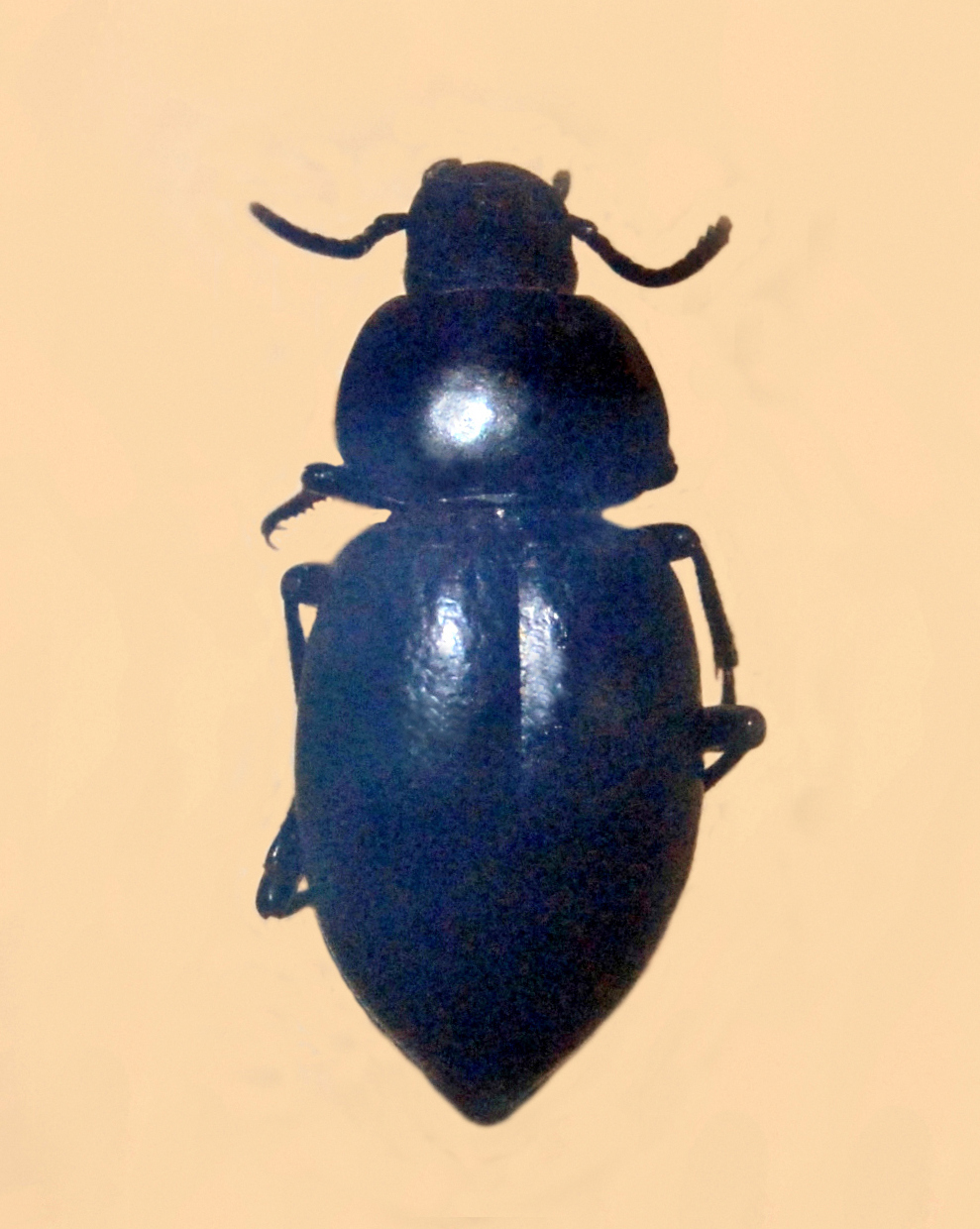
- Homala integricollis from East Africa. Mounted specimen

Scientific classification
- Kingdom: Animalia
- Phylum: Arthropoda
- Clade: Pancrustacea
- Class: Insecta
- Order: Coleoptera
- Suborder: Polyphaga
- Infraorder: Cucujiformia
- Family: Tenebrionidae
- Subfamily: Pimeliinae
- Tribe: Tentyriini
- Genus: Homala; Eschscholtz, 1831

= Homala =

Genus of beetles

Homala is a genus of beetles in the family Tenebrionidae.

== Species ==
- Homala integricollis Fairmaire, 1884
- Homala polita Solier 1835
