= Colposcelis elegans =

Scientific classification
- Kingdom: Animalia
- Phylum: Arthropoda
- Class: Insecta
- Order: Coleoptera
- Suborder: Polyphaga
- Infraorder: Cucujiformia
- Family: Tenebrionidae
- Genus: Colposcelis
- Species: C. elegans

Binomial name
- Colposcelis elegans Kaszab, 1968

Species of beetle

Colposcelis elegans is a species of darkling beetle in the subfamily Pimeliinae. It has a palaearctic distribution in Asia.
