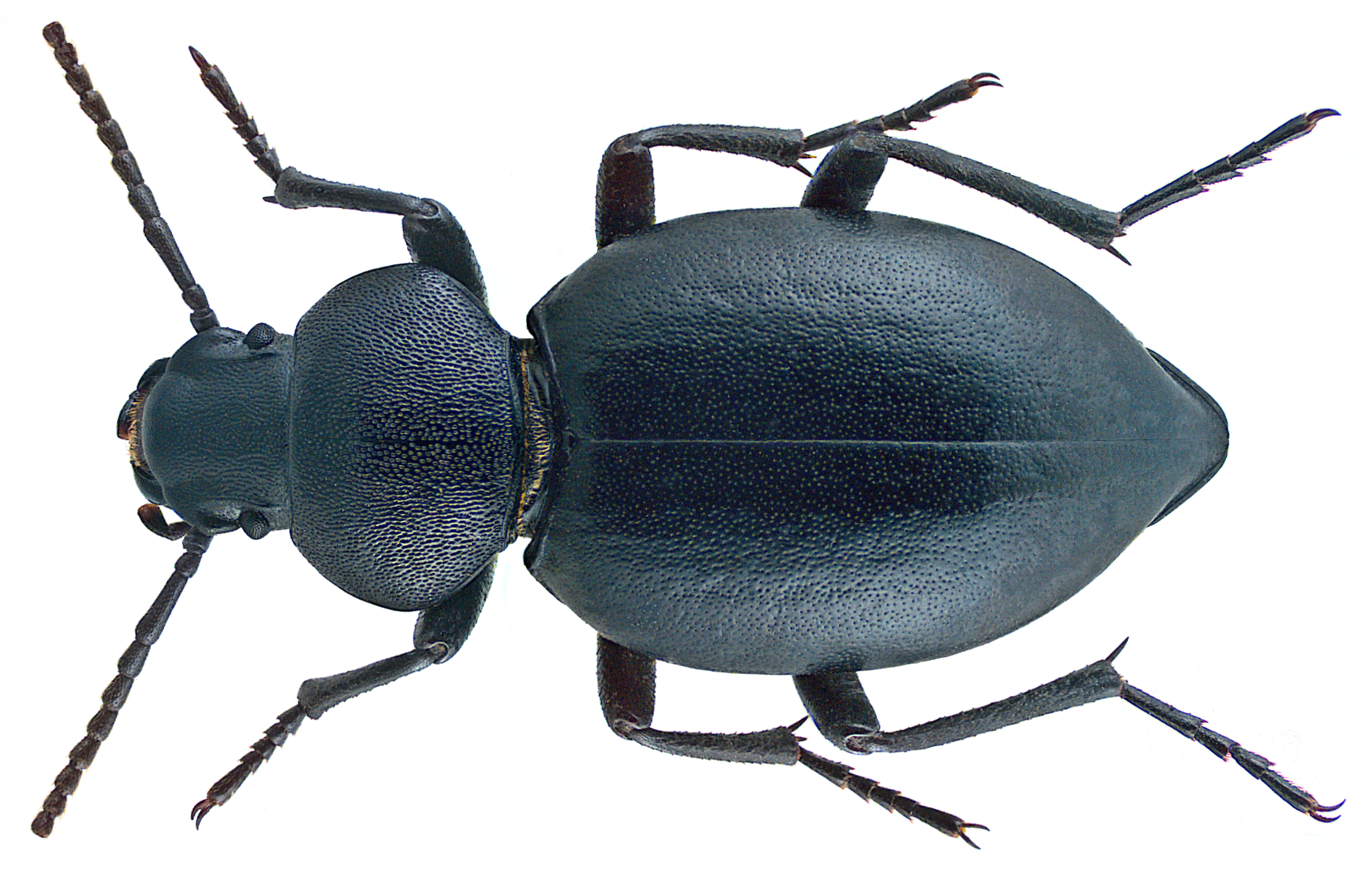
- Tentyria cypria, Cyprus

Scientific classification
- Kingdom: Animalia
- Phylum: Arthropoda
- Class: Insecta
- Order: Coleoptera
- Suborder: Polyphaga
- Infraorder: Cucujiformia
- Family: Tenebrionidae
- Subfamily: Pimeliinae
- Tribe: Tentyriini; Eschscholtz, 1831

= Tentyriini =

Tribe of beetles

Tentyriini is a tribe of darkling beetles in the subfamily Pimeliinae of the family Tenebrionidae. There are more than 90 genera in Tentyriini.

== Genera ==
These genera belong to the tribe Tentyriini

- Abigopsis Escalera, 1914 (the Palearctic)
- Afrinus Fairmaire, 1888 (tropical Africa)
- Alcinoeta Strand, 1929 (the Palearctic)
- Amblycarenum Gebien, 1910 (the Palearctic)
- Ammogiton Peyerimhoff, 1920 (the Palearctic)
- Anatolica Eschscholtz, 1831 (the Palearctic)
- Aphrotus Péringuey, 1904 (tropical Africa)
- Archinamibia Koch, 1952 (tropical Africa)
- Asphaltesthes Kraatz, 1865 (tropical Africa)
- Broomium Koch, 1950 (tropical Africa)
- Calyptopsis Solier, 1835 (the Palearctic)
- Cantopipleurus Koch, 1943 (tropical Africa)
- Capnisiceps Chatanay, 1914 (tropical Africa)
- Catomulus Reitter, 1897 (the Palearctic)
- Cimipsa Peyerimhoff, 1911 (the Palearctic)
- Colposcelis Dejean, 1834 (the Palearctic)
- Colposphena Semenov, 1889 (the Palearctic)
- Craniosphena Koch, 1962 (tropical Africa)
- Cychrachna Koch, 1950 (tropical Africa)
- Cyphostethe Marseul, 1867 (the Palearctic and tropical Africa)
- Dailognatha Steven, 1828 (the Palearctic)
- Dengitha Reitter, 1887 (the Palearctic)
- Derosphaerius Westwood, 1881 (tropical Africa)
- Dichomma Solier, 1835 (the Palearctic)
- Dividiopsa Koch, 1944 (tropical Africa)
- Epitrichia Gebler, 1859 (the Palearctic)
- Eschatostena Keleinikova, 1977 (the Palearctic)
- Eulipus Wollaston, 1864 (the Palearctic)
- Eusyntelia C.O. Waterhouse, 1881 (tropical Africa)
- Falsocatomulus Pic, 1914 (the Palearctic)
- Freudeia Kaszab, 1961 (Indomalaya)
- Freyitia Koch, 1943 (Indomalaya)
- Girardius L. Soldati, 2009 (the Palearctic)
- Gnathosia Fischer von Waldheim, 1821 (the Palearctic)
- Gnophota Erichson, 1843 (tropical Africa)
- Hegeter Latreille, 1802 (the Palearctic and tropical Africa)
- Hegeterocara Reitter, 1900 (the Palearctic)
- Herlesa Reitter, 1897 (the Palearctic)
- Hionthis Miller, 1861 (the Palearctic)
- Homala Eschscholtz, 1831 (tropical Africa)
- Homalinota Koch, 1950 (tropical Africa)
- Homoeonota Fairmaire, 1882 (the Palearctic and tropical Africa)
- Hyonthosoma Reitter, 1900 (the Palearctic)
- Hyperops Eschscholtz, 1831 (the Palearctic, tropical Africa, and Indomalaya)
- Hypsosoma Ménétriés, 1854 (the Palearctic)
- Imatismus Dejean, 1834 (the Palearctic, tropical Africa, and Indomalaya)
- Kokeniella Reitter, 1906 (Indomalaya)
- Leptosphena Semenov, 1891 (the Palearctic)
- Megagenius Solier, 1835 (the Palearctic)
- Melanochrus Wollaston, 1864 (the Palearctic)
- Melaxumia Reitter, 1895 (the Palearctic)
- Mesostena Eschscholtz, 1831 (the Palearctic and tropical Africa)
- Micipsa P.H. Lucas, 1855 (the Palearctic and tropical Africa)
- Microdera Eschscholtz, 1831 (the Palearctic)
- Microderopsis Haag-Rutenberg, 1876 (tropical Africa)
- Namaquaeon Koch, 1950 (tropical Africa)
- Namibismus Koch, 1952 (tropical Africa)
- Neognathosia Kaszab, 1959 (the Palearctic)
- Nerinodon Koch, 1952 (tropical Africa)
- Nothrocerus Fairmaire, 1887 (tropical Africa)
- Orostegastopsis Koch, 1962 (tropical Africa)
- Oterophloeus Desbrochers des Loges, 1881 (the Palearctic)
- Oxycara Solier, 1835 (the Palearctic, tropical Africa, and Indomalaya)
- Oxycarops Reitter, 1900 (the Palearctic)
- Pachychila Eschscholtz, 1831 (the Palearctic)
- Paivaea Wollaston, 1864 (the Palearctic)
- Parabigopsis Español, 1946 (the Palearctic)
- Paracirta Schuster, 1930 (the Palearctic)
- Paulianesthes Koch, 1962 (tropical Africa)
- Phaeotribon Kraatz, 1865 (the Palearctic and tropical Africa)
- Prochoma Solier, 1835 (the Palearctic and Indomalaya)
- Psammocryptus Kraatz, 1865 (the Palearctic)
- Psammoica Solier, 1835 (the Palearctic)
- Rhammatodes Haag-Rutenberg, 1876 (tropical Africa)
- Rhomaleus Chatanay, 1915 (the Palearctic and tropical Africa)
- Rhytinota Eschscholtz, 1831 (tropical Africa and Indomalaya)
- Rozonia Fairmaire, 1888 (tropical Africa)
- Scelosodis Solier, 1835 (the Palearctic)
- Schweinfurthia Andres, 1922 (the Palearctic and tropical Africa)
- Scythis Kraatz, 1865 (the Palearctic)
- Scytosoma Reitter, 1895 (the Palearctic)
- Sinoecia Chatanay, 1914 (the Palearctic)
- Sphenaria Ménétriés, 1849 (the Palearctic)
- Stegastopsis Kraatz, 1865 (the Palearctic)
- Stenosida Solier, 1835 (Indomalaya and Australasia)
- Syachis Bates, 1879 (the Palearctic)
- Tamena Reitter, 1900 (the Palearctic)
- Tentyria Latreille, 1802 (the Palearctic)
- Tentyrina Reitter, 1900 (the Palearctic and tropical Africa)
- Tentyronota Reitter, 1900 (the Palearctic)
- Thalpobia Fairmaire, 1871 (the Palearctic)
- Thalpophilodes Strand, 1942 (tropical Africa)
- Thraustocolus Kraatz, 1866 (the Palearctic and tropical Africa)
- Trichosphaena Reitter, 1916 (the Palearctic and tropical Africa)
- Uyttenboogaartia Koch, 1943 (the Palearctic)
