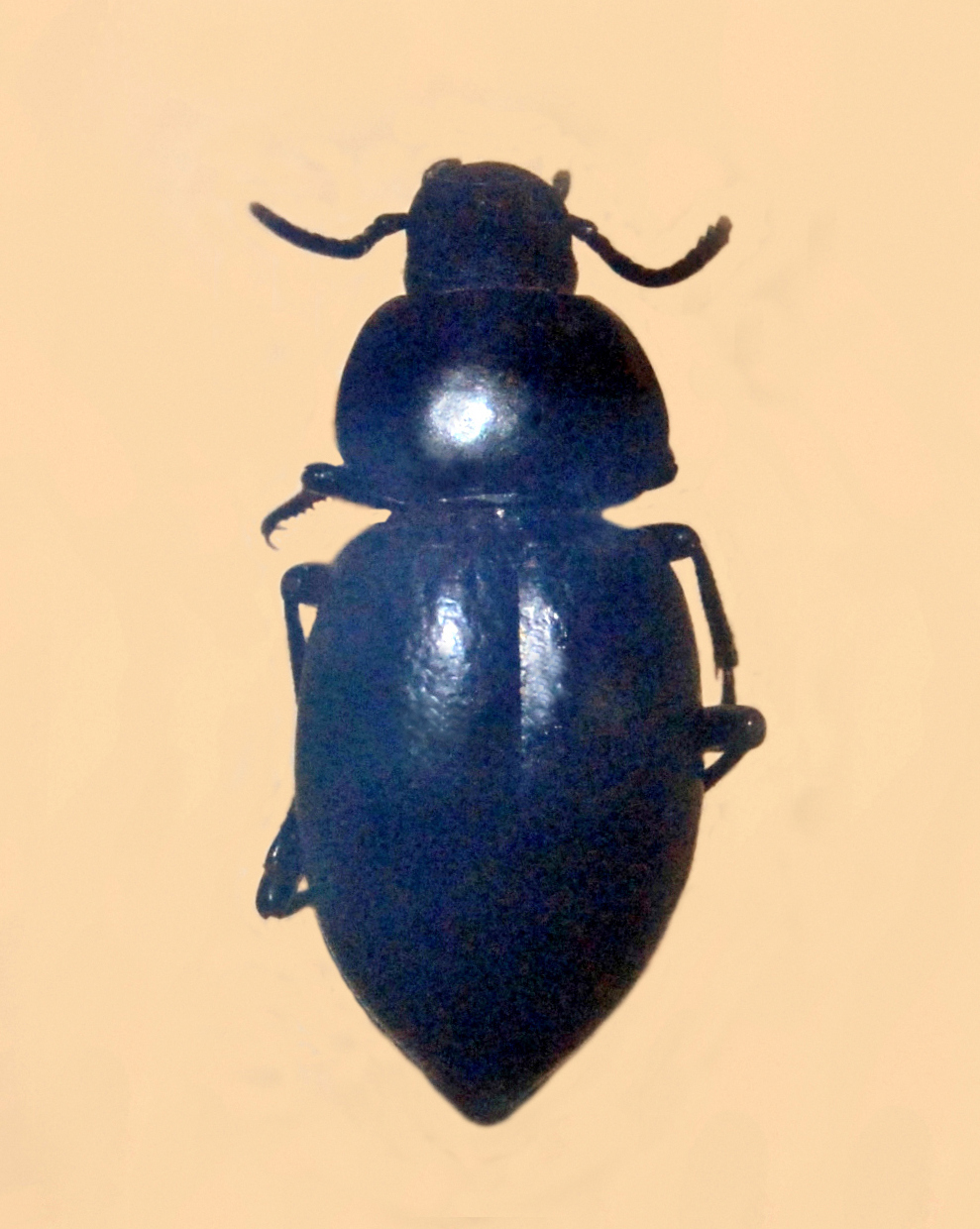
- Homala integricollis from East Africa. Mounted specimen

Scientific classification
- Kingdom: Animalia
- Phylum: Arthropoda
- Clade: Pancrustacea
- Class: Insecta
- Order: Coleoptera
- Suborder: Polyphaga
- Infraorder: Cucujiformia
- Family: Tenebrionidae
- Genus: Homala
- Species: H. integricollis

Binomial name
- Homala integricollis Fairmaire, 1884

= Homala integricollis =

Species of beetle

Homala integricollis is a species of beetles in the family Tenebrionidae. It can be found in East Africa.
