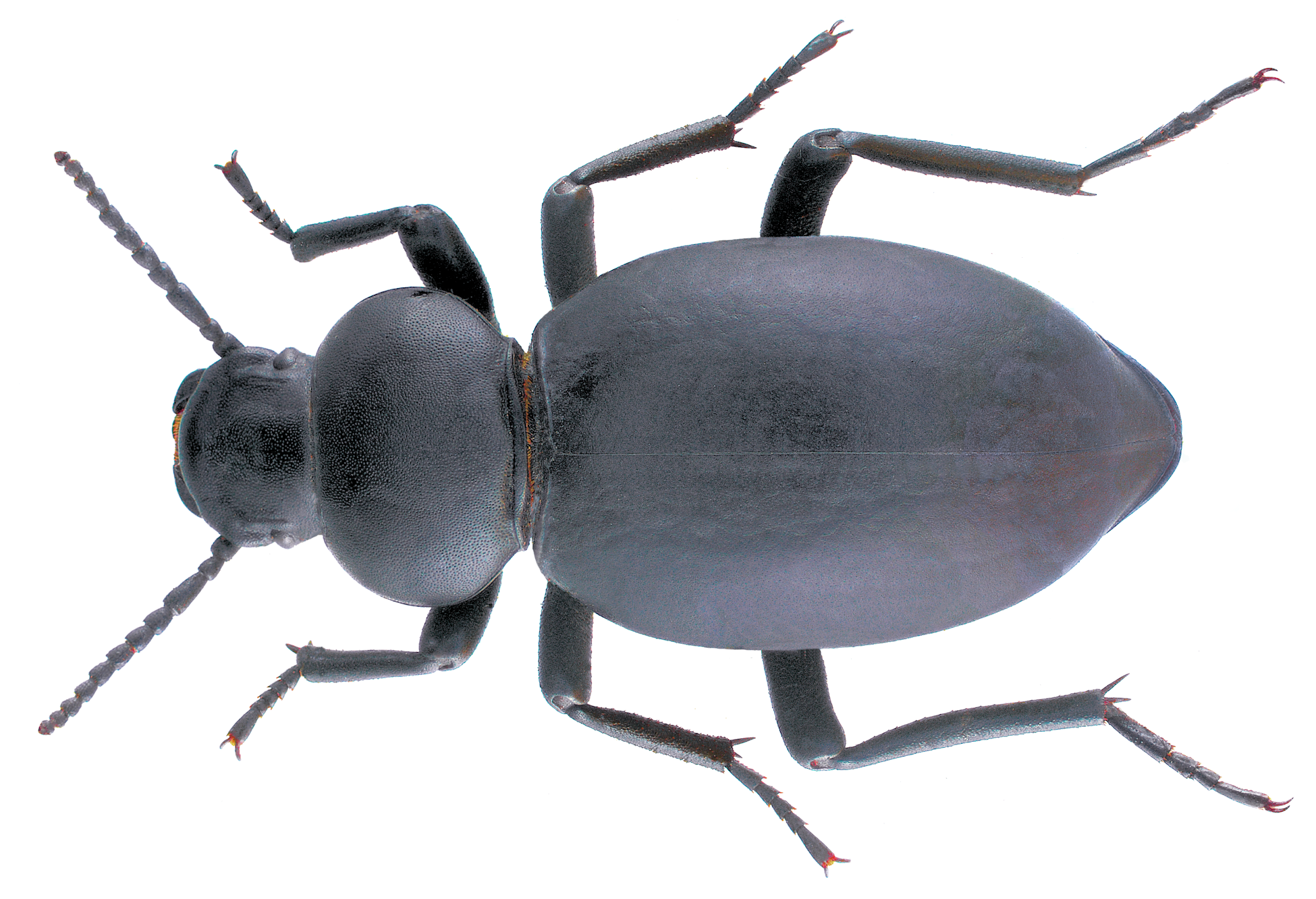

Scientific classification
- Kingdom: Animalia
- Phylum: Arthropoda
- Clade: Pancrustacea
- Class: Insecta
- Order: Coleoptera
- Suborder: Polyphaga
- Infraorder: Cucujiformia
- Family: Tenebrionidae
- Genus: Tentyria
- Species: T. discicollis

Binomial name
- Tentyria discicollis Reiche & Saulcy, 1857

= Tentyria discicollis =

Species of beetle

Tentyria discicollis is a species of beetle, of the genus Tentyria, family Tenebrioninae. It was first scientifically documented by Reiche and Saulcy in 1857.

Tentyria discicollis weighs approximately 0.2 grams and is present in and around the Sinai Peninsula, in Egypt, Syria and Israel. It is also known to inhabit in and around the Dead Sea. Its main habitat is in stony and dry areas.
