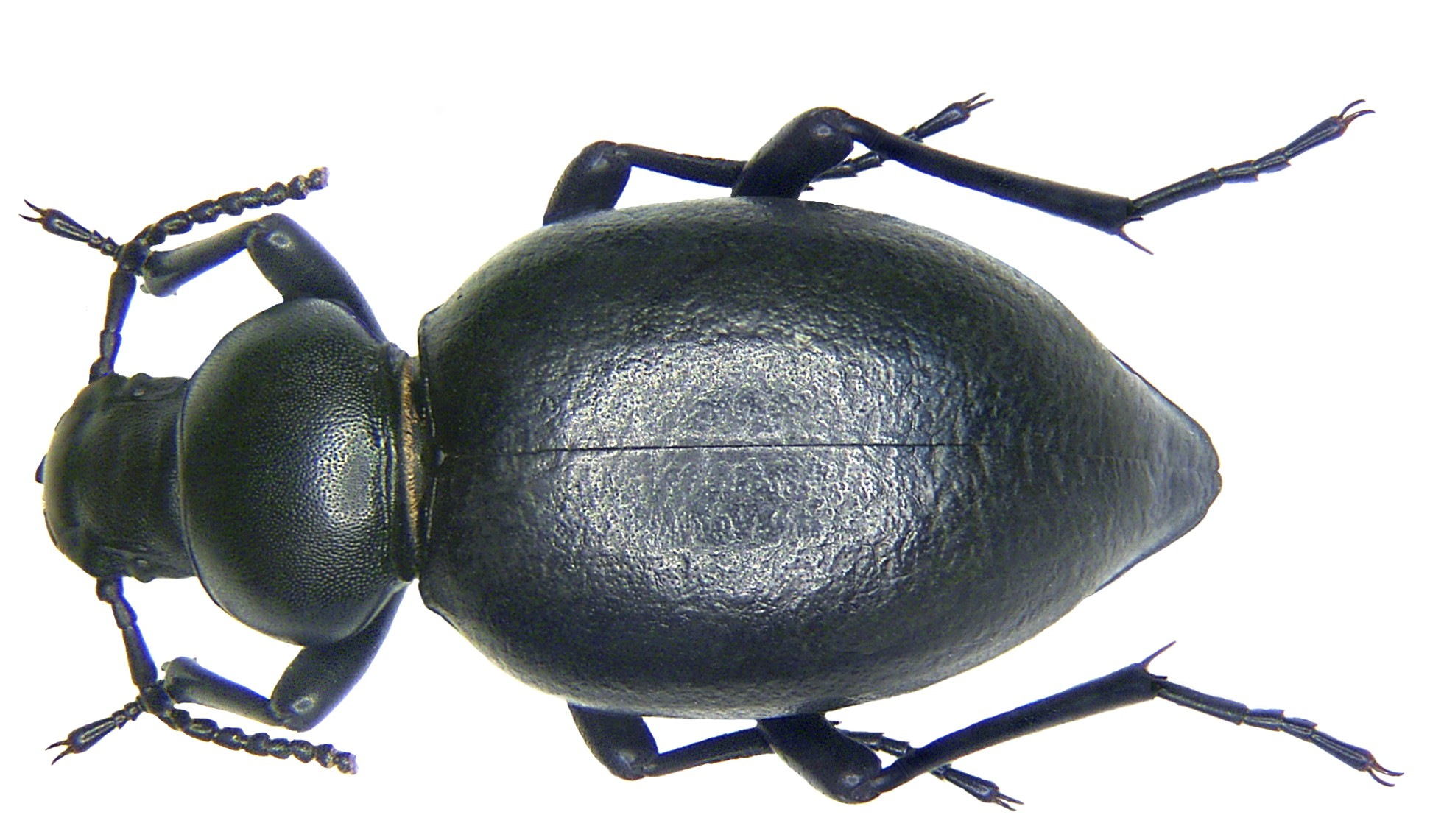
- Tentyria rotundata mittrei

Scientific classification
- Domain: Eukaryota
- Kingdom: Animalia
- Phylum: Arthropoda
- Class: Insecta
- Order: Coleoptera
- Suborder: Polyphaga
- Infraorder: Cucujiformia
- Family: Tenebrionidae
- Tribe: Tentyriini
- Genus: Tentyria; Latreille, 1802

Synonyms
- Heliodromus Brullé, 1832

= Tentyria =

Genus of beetles

Tentyria is a genus of beetles in the family Tenebrionidae, first scientifically documented by Pierre André Latreille in 1802.

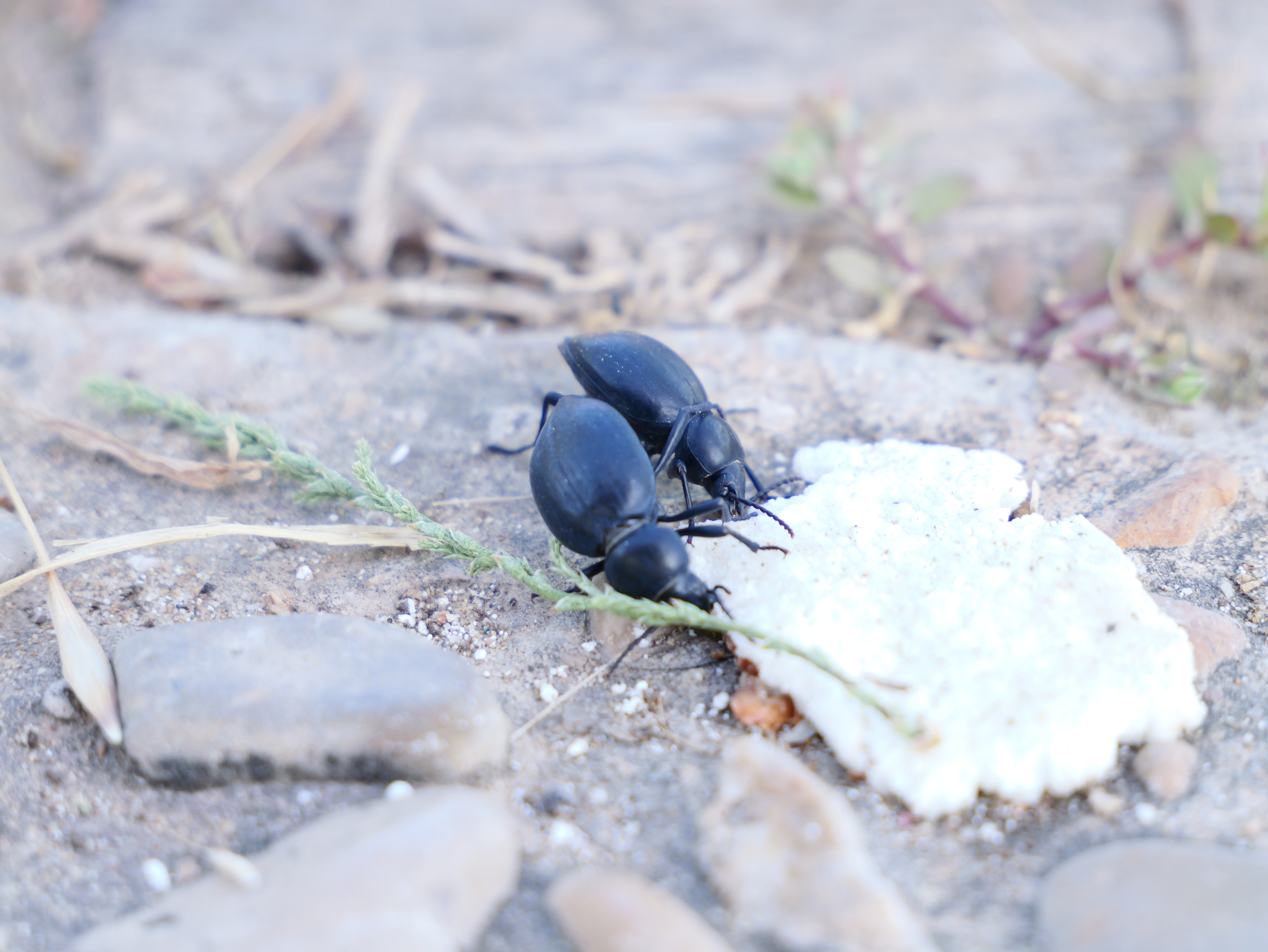
Imago Tentyria sp. (Tenebrionidae) bugs eating the polystyrene foam - El Grao de Castellon, Spain, 2024

== List of species ==
- Tentyria acuticollis
- Tentyria angulata
- Tentyria angustata
- Tentyria arabica
- Tentyria aragonica
- Tentyria atlantis
- Tentyria balachowskyi
- Tentyria barbara
- Tentyria basalis
- Tentyria bassii
- Tentyria bogdanovi
- Tentyria brachythorax
- Tentyria calcophila
- Tentyria cassolai
- Tentyria castillana
- Tentyria castrogironai
- Tentyria clavata
- Tentyria coerulescens
- Tentyria collatina
- Tentyria confalonierii
- Tentyria confusa
- Tentyria coniophthalma
- Tentyria convexipennis
- Tentyria corrugata
- Tentyria curculionoides
- Tentyria cylindrica
- Tentyria cypria
- Tentyria cyrenaica
- Tentyria daghestris
- Tentyria discicollis
- Tentyria duponti
- Tentyria elegans
- Tentyria elongata
- Tentyria emarginata
- Tentyria escalerai
- Tentyria eulipoides
- Tentyria euphratica
- Tentyria excavata
- Tentyria floresii
- Tentyria fossulata
- Tentyria frivaldskii
- Tentyria gaditana
- Tentyria gavdosana
- Tentyria geliae
- Tentyria gibbicollis
- Tentyria gigas
- Tentyria glabra
- Tentyria grossa
- Tentyria gusbatensis
- Tentyria herculeana
- Tentyria heydeni
- Tentyria incerta
- Tentyria incusa
- Tentyria intermedia
- Tentyria interrupta
- Tentyria ionica
- Tentyria italica
- Tentyria jordani
- Tentyria kantarae
- Tentyria kriegi
- Tentyria kursistana
- Tentyria laevigata
- Tentyria lateritia
- Tentyria laticollis
- Tentyria latreillei
- Tentyria leachii
- Tentyria levis
- Tentyria ligurica
- Tentyria mauritanica
- Tentyria mesopotamica
- Tentyria mittrei
- Tentyria morgani
- Tentyria mucronata
- Tentyria mulsanti
- Tentyria nomas
- Tentyria oblonga
- Tentyria oblongipennis
- Tentyria occidentalis
- Tentyria ocularis
- Tentyria olgae
- Tentyria ophiusae
- Tentyria orbicollis
- Tentyria orbiculata
- Tentyria paganettii
- Tentyria parallela
- Tentyria pazi
- Tentyria peiroleri
- Tentyria pierrei
- Tentyria platyceps
- Tentyria pseudogigas
- Tentyria pseudolaevis
- Tentyria pseudorugosa
- Tentyria punctata
- Tentyria punctatostriata
- Tentyria puncticeps
- Tentyria pygmaea
- Tentyria ramburi
- Tentyria robustoides
- Tentyria rotundata
- Tentyria rotundata mittrei
- Tentyria rugipleuris
- Tentyria rugosa
- Tentyria sardiniensis
- Tentyria scabripennis
- Tentyria schaumi
- Tentyria scorteccii
- Tentyria sinaitica
- Tentyria sinuatocollis
- Tentyria solieri
- Tentyria sommieri
- Tentyria sporadica
- Tentyria striatopunctata
- Tentyria subcostata
- Tentyria subrugosa
- Tentyria sulcatipennis
- Tentyria syrtana
- Tentyria syrtica
- Tentyria taurica
- Tentyria tessulata
- Tentyria thunbergii
- Tentyria transversicollis
- Tentyria valentinae
- Tentyria variabilis
- Tentyria varioculata
- Tentyria velox
- Tentyria vieta
- Tentyria villiersi
- Tentyria wiedemanni
- Tentyria winkleri
- Tentyria zimmermanni
