= Ouau en Namu lakes =

Protected area in Libya

- Location: Libya

Ouau en Namu lakes is a protected area of Libya.
