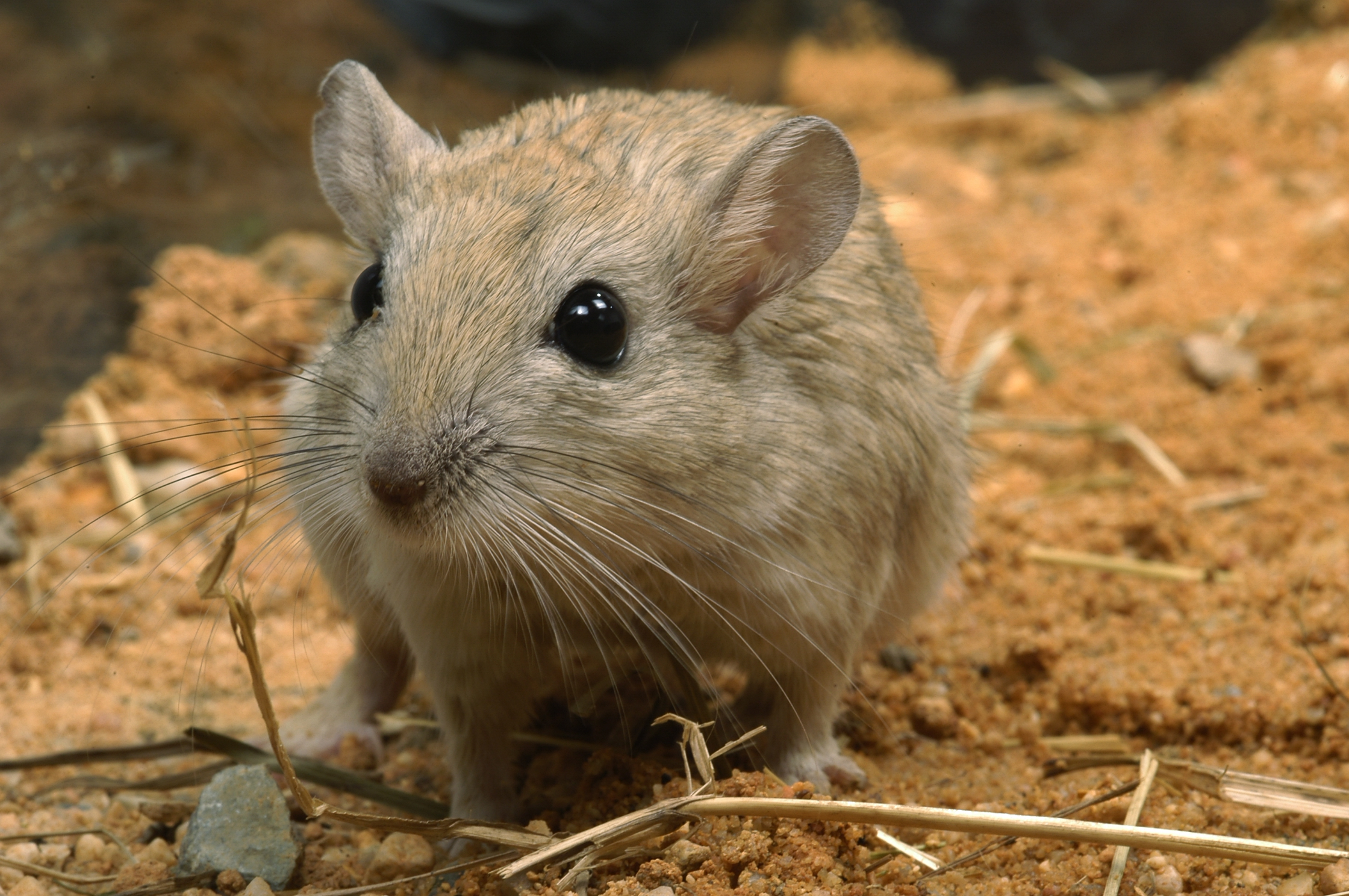

Conservation status
- Least Concern (IUCN 3.1)

Scientific classification
- Kingdom: Animalia
- Phylum: Chordata
- Class: Mammalia
- Order: Rodentia
- Family: Muridae
- Genus: Meriones
- Species: M. crassus

Binomial name
- Meriones crassus Sundevall, 1842

Synonyms
- M. longifrons

= Sundevall's jird =

Species of rodent

Sundevall's jird (Meriones crassus) is a species of rodent in the family of Muridae. It is found in Afghanistan, Algeria, Egypt, Iran, Iraq, Israel, Jordan, Kuwait, Libya, Pakistan, Morocco, Niger, Palestine, Oman, Saudi Arabia, Sudan, Syria, Tunisia, Turkey, Western Sahara, United Arab Emirates, Bahrain and possibly Mali. Its natural habitat is hot deserts.

== Description ==
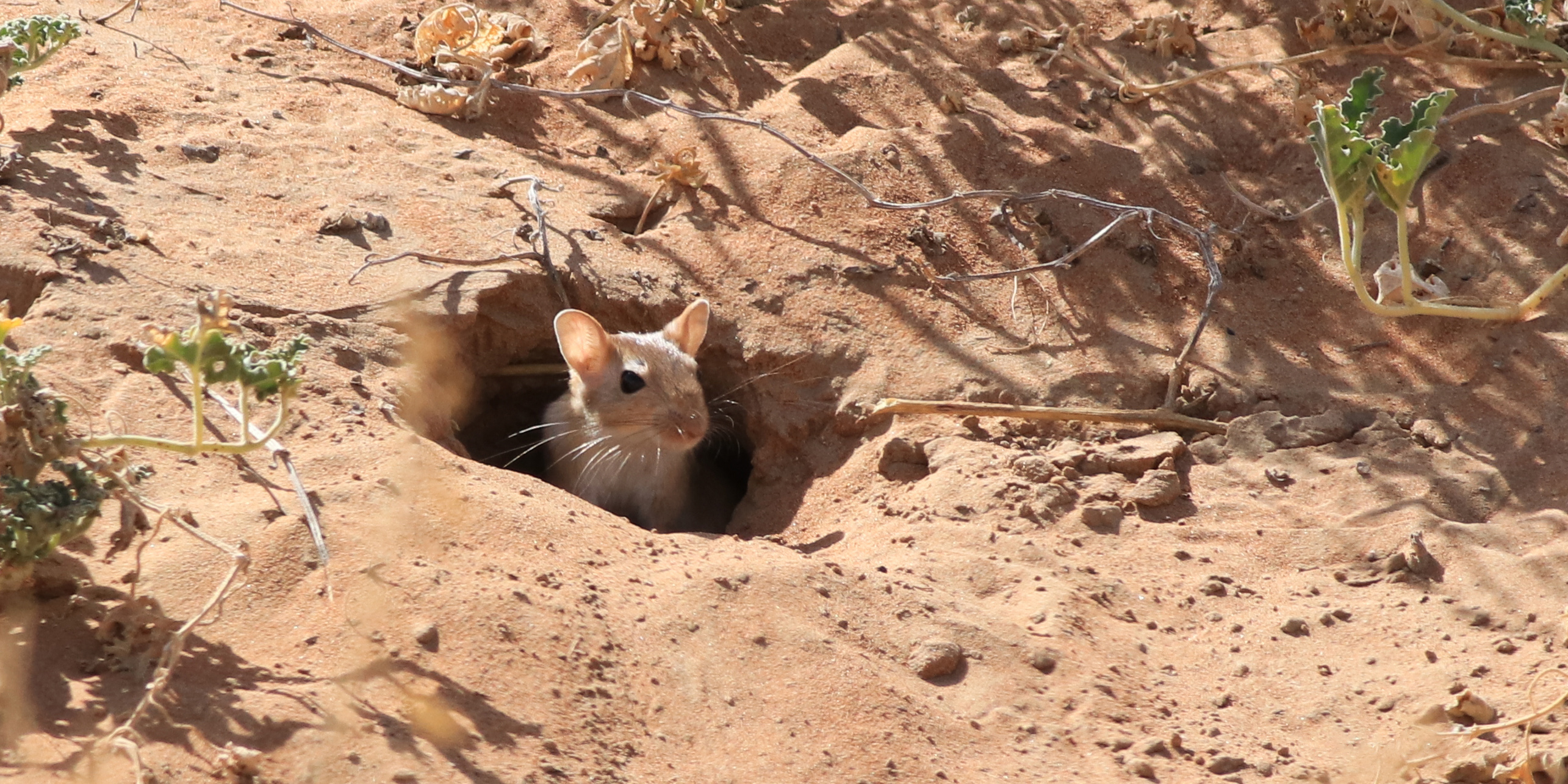
Sundevall's jird looking from one of the entrances of its burrow

Sundevall's jird is a medium-sized gerbilline rodent with an average mass of about 100 g (3.53 oz). They can range in size depending on sex. The average length (not including the tail) is about 15 cm (5.91 in). Their tails can be as long as their bodies. Sundevall's jird has a soft, fine, light brown fur, with a lighter underbelly.

== Distribution and habitat ==
The Sundevall's jird is found in dry habitats like deserts across northern Africa. It can be found in rocky areas, but prefers sand-like soil. They create burrows in the sand where they create nests.

== Reproduction ==
Like any mammal, the Sundevall's jird cares for its offspring by producing milk. Being a relatively small mammal, the Sundevall's jird must intake a higher amount of calories to make enough milk. Gestation can last between 18 and 22 days, and they give birth to between 2 and 7 pups. Young are born without fur, are blind, and have very long whiskers. The breeding season for Sundevall's jird is from January to September, with peak times from February to May.

== Parasites ==
The Sundevall's jird can be occupied by a variety of parasites, especially species of fleas. It has been found that male Sundevall's jird harbor more species of parasites than females do, which is still being studied. Along with parasites come the parasites of parasites, in this case, bacteria. Bacteria can be transmitted to the Sundevall's jird by the flea biting the rodent.

== Bibliography ==
- Musser, G. G.; Carleton, M. D. (2005). "Superfamily Muroidea". In Wilson, D. E.; Reeder, D. M. (eds.). Mammal Species of the World: A Taxonomic and Geographic Reference (3rd ed.). Johns Hopkins University Press. pp. 894–1531. ISBN 978-0-8018-8221-0. OCLC 62265494.
- Palgi, N., Y. Naaman, and A. Haim. "Body Temperature Daily Rhythms of the Fat Jird Meriones crassus: Effects of Beta and Alpha Adrenergic Blockers." Journal of Thermal Biology 31.1-2 (2006): 177-80. Print.
- Koffler, Barry R. "Meriones crassus." Mammalian Species 9 (1972): 1-4. Print.
- Degen, A. Allan, Irina S. Khokhlova, and Michael Kam. "Milk Production of the Dam Limits the Growth Rate of Sundevall's Jird (Meriones crassus) pups." Mammaliam Biology 76.3 (2011): 285-89. Print.
- Khokhlova, Irina S., et al. "Is the Feeding and Reproductive Performance of the Flea, Xenopsylla ramesis, Affected by the Gender of Its odent Host, Meriones crassus?" Journal of Experimental Biology 212 (2009): 1429-35. Print.
- Morick, Danny, et al. "Transmission Dynamics of Bartonella sp. Strain OE 1-1 in Sundevall's Jirds (Meriones crassus)." Applied and Environmental Microbiology 79.4 (2013): 1258-64. Print.
