= El-Kouf National Park =

National park in Libya

- IUCN category II (national park)
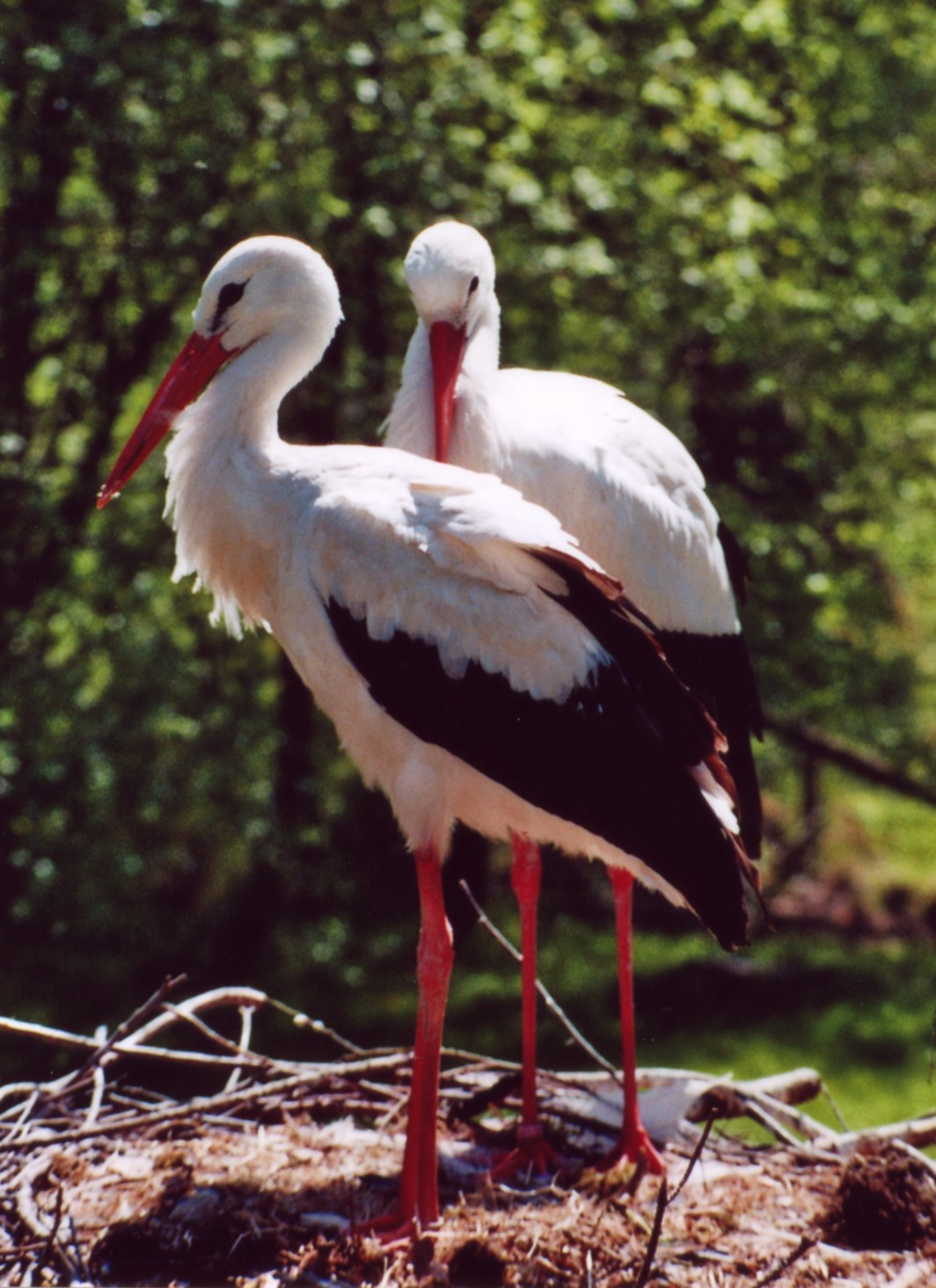
- White stork (Ciconia ciconia)

- Location within Libya
- Coordinates: 32°44′36″N 21°12′18″E
- Area: 350 km^{2} (140 sq mi)
- Established: 1975
- Visitors: 300,000

El Kouf National Park, established in 1975, is one of the seven national parks of Libya. El Kouf is located along Libya's northeastern Mediterranean coastline and has both marine and terrestrial biodiversity. Libya also has five other reserves, twenty four protected areas and two wetlands, Ain Elshakika Wetland and Ain Elzarga Wetland, protected under the Ramsar Convention since 2000.

== Background and location ==
El Kouf National Park was established in 1975. The park was visited by about 100,000 tourists in 1980, which increased to about 300,000 in 1985. Despite attracting so many tourists, for a long period the park had very few staff with specific wildlife conservation duties. In 1991, the park was reported to be poorly managed and inadequately regulated.

The park is very close to Wadi el Kuf Bridge. Almost 180 kilometres (110 mi) north-east of Benghazi, 19 kilometres (12 mi) west of Al Bayda town on the north-eastern side of Libya. It covers a land area of 35,000 hectares (86,000 acres) with a coastline of 20 km. The total conservation area, however, is 100,000 hectares (250,000 acres) including the large basin area of Wadi El Kouf and also beaches, rocky cliffs, sand dunes and ephemeral lagoons. The area is bounded by the limestone mass of Jabel Al-Akhdar, a mountain of 860 metres (2,820 ft) forming a rectangular area bordered by the coast line of the Mediterranean Sea.

== Wildlife ==
=== Flora ===
About 90% of the plants found in Libya have been recorded growing in the park. The coastal dunes are clad with coarse grasses and scattered bushes. The limestone hills further inland are covered in tangled maquis shrubland. Some species present here include Cedrus atlantica (cultivated), Juniperus phoenicea, Pistacia lentiscus, Arbutus pavarii, Olea europaea, Myrtus communis, Quercus coccifera and some groves of Cupressus sempervirens. Goats and sheep pose a problem for managing the flora of the park.

=== Fauna ===
The fauna species recorded include the striped hyena (Hyaena hyaena), the Egyptian wolf (Canis anthus lupaster), wild boar (Sus scrofa), fallow deer (Dama dama), the red fox (Vulpes vulpes), the small-spotted genet (Genetta genetta), the African wildcat (Felis silvestris lybica) and the crested porcupine (Hystrix cristata) and the Barbary macaque (Macaca sylvanus). The short-beaked common dolphin (Delphinus delphis) and the common bottlenose dolphin (Tursiops truncatus) are found off-shore and in the brackish lagoons, and the loggerhead sea turtle (Caretta caretta) lays its eggs on the beaches.

==== Birds ====
The national park lies within the Jabal al Akhdar Important Bird Area, identified as such by BirdLife International. Birds recorded from the park include golden eagles, Egyptian vulture, Barbary partridges, common quails, great bustard, Houbara bustards, black storks, white storks and sandgrouse, as well as herons, ducks and waders. Also noted are greater flamingos on the beaches and green peafowl introduced also many birds of prey.
