= Harouj Mountain =

Mountain in Libya

Harouj Mountain, also Gebel-Harouj or the Black Harouj Mountains, is a mountain and protected area of Libya.

It is located in the central part of Libya. The highest peak of the mountains (Qaraf as Sabah) is located at 1200m above sea level and is surrounded by a huge area of lava flow, which also explains its name.
