= Algharabolli National Park =

National park in Libya

- Karabolli National Park
- IUCN category II (national park)
- Location within Libya
- Location: Libya
- Nearest city: Tripoli
- Coordinates: 32.784°N 13.783°E
- Area: 80 km^{2} (31 sq mi)
- Established: 1992

Algharabolli National Park, also Karabolli National Park, is a national park of Libya close to Tripoli, and next to Al-Garabulli. It was established in 1992 and covers an area of 8,000 hectares (20,000 acres).

== Wildlife ==
The park houses freshwater streams from springs as well as coastal areas on the Mediterranean Sea. It is well known for its beaches, sand dunes and sheer cliffs. It has been designated an Important Bird Area (IBA) by BirdLife International because it supports significant populations of Barbary partridges, and Sardinian and speckled warblers. A notable mammal species present is the striped hyena.
