= Grotto de Lete =

Caves in Libya

Grotto de Lete is a protected area of Libya.
