= Shahaat =

Area in Libya

Shahaat is a protected area of Libya.
