= Benghazi Reserve =

Benghazi Reserve is a protected reserve of Libya.

The Benghazi Nature Reserve is located approximately 14 kilometers north of the city of Benghazi on the Mediterranean coast. The reserve is famous for migratory waterbirds, and includes a stretch of beach dunes and salt marshes. In addition to many lakes

The City of Seven Lakes: This name is named after seven lakes surrounding the city. These lakes are known as natural areas submerged in fresh water or with high or low salinity, which are either flowing or stagnant. With their natural and ecological appearances, they are considered the regulating element of marine life, wildlife, and biodiversity. It is also of economic value, as it can constitute an important possibility for scientific studies, natural tourism, and recreational activities.
