= Ain Elzarga Wetland =

Coordinates: 32°47′N 22°21′E

Designations

Ramsar Wetland
- Official name: Ain Elzarga
- Designated: 5 April 2000
- Reference no.: 1027

Ain Elzarga Wetland is a Ramsar-protected wetland of Libya. It was established in 2000 and covers an area of 33 hectares (82 acres). Ramsar says of it: "A small natural sebkha or depression with at least one natural connection to the sea, wet all year round but with increasing water levels and salinity during summer. The sebkha, with mudflats and salt marsh community, is surrounded by dunes from east to west and rocky hills to the south and east. The site is one of the most important wetlands in the area of the El Kouf National Park for migratory waterbirds. The birdwatching and ecotourism potential is considerable but undeveloped. Unsustainable hunting and destruction of vegetation, especially during summer, are considered threats."
