= Nefhusa =

Nefhusa is a protected area of Libya, which is northeast of the town Gharyan and 70 km south-south-west of Tripoli. There are at least 46 species within the protected area.
