= Rajma plantations =

Protected area in Libya

- Location: Libya

Rajma plantations is a protected area of Libya.
