= Taoulga islands =

Protected area of Libya

Taoulga islands is a protected area of Libya.
