= Surman National Park =

Libyan national park

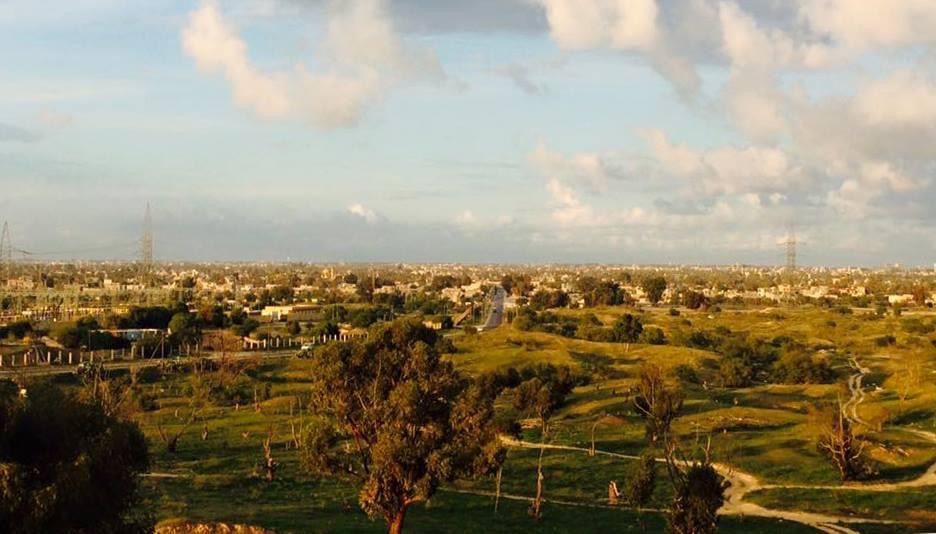
- Image of Surman National Park, 2022

- Location within Libya
- Location: Libya
- Nearest city: Tripoli
- Coordinates: 32.718311°N 12.559407°E
- Area: 4 km^{2} (1.5 sq mi)
- Established: 1992

Surman National Park or Sirman National Park (غابة صرمان والمنتزه الوطني) is a national park of Libya. It was established in 1992 and covers an area of 400 hectares (990 acres). It lies about 50 kilometres (31 mi) west of Tripoli, not far from the archaeological ruins of Sabratha.
