= Tripoli Reserve =

Protected area in Libya

Tripoli Reserve is a protected reserve of Libya.
