= Arbutus pavarii =

Conservation status
- Vulnerable (IUCN 2.3)

Scientific classification
- Kingdom: Plantae
- Clade: Tracheophytes
- Clade: Angiosperms
- Clade: Eudicots
- Clade: Asterids
- Order: Ericales
- Family: Ericaceae
- Genus: Arbutus
- Species: A. pavarii

Binomial name
- Arbutus pavarii Pampan. 1936

Species of flowering plant

Arbutus pavarii is a species of plant in the heath family. It is endemic to Libya's Jebel Akhdar range in coastal Cyrenaica.
