= Ajdabiya Marsh =

Protected area in Libya

- Location within Libya
- Location: near Ajdabiya, Cyrenaica, Libya
- Coordinates: 30.805°N 20.045°E
- Area: 20 km^{2} (7.7 sq mi)

Ajdabiya Marsh is a protected wetland in northeastern Libya.

== Ecology and conservation ==
Located near the Gulf of Sidra, the wetland covers around 20.4km^{2} in an area that is typically arid.

In 2016, the wetland was named an internationally significant Key Biodiversity Area. It has been recognized in other international conservation initiatives, such as the Mediterranean biodiversity hotspot assessments.
