= Bier Ayyad Reserve =

Protected reserve in Libya

Coordinates: 32.2128°N 12.4489°E

Bier Ayyad Reserve is a protected reserve of Libya.

It covers an area of 20 km2.
