= Qaminis and Tukrah salines =

Qaminis and Tukrah salines is a protected area of Libya.
