= Sebkha el Sahel =

Area in Libya

Sebkha el Sahel is a protected area of Libya.
