= Oasis of Ghat =

Oasis of Ghat is a protected area of Libya. It is located in south-western Libya, very close to the Algerian border.

An ancient Saharan caravan route used to pass there, and there used to be a center for the slave trade.
