= New Hiesha Natural Reserve =

New Hiesha Natural Reserve is a protected reserve in Libya.
