= El Naggaza National Park =

National park in Libya

- IUCN category II (national park)
- Location within Libya
- Location: Libya
- Nearest city: Tripoli
- Coordinates: 32.779°N 13.879°E
- Area: 40 km^{2} (15 sq mi)
- Established: 1993

El Naggaza National Park is a national park of Libya in the Murqub district close to Tripoli. It was established in 1993 and covers an area of 4,000 hectares (9,900 acres).

== Flora and fauna ==
The park hosts various species of birds such as flamingos and gulls, as well as other species of animals such as seals.
