= Ain Zayanah =

Protected area of Libya northeast of Benghazi

Coordinates: 32°13′N 20°9′E

Ain Zayanah is a protected area of Libya. It has an area of 500 hectares, and covers the Ayn Zayanah lagoon and a portion of the coast 15 km northeast of Benghazi. It is a component of the Benghazi Nature Reserve.

In the Ain Zayanah lagoon there is a large representation of macroinvertebrates.

The various species of fish, amphipods, isopods, cladocerans, copepods and molluscs mainly represent the animal world in the Ain Zayanah lagoon.
