= Bombah Gulf =

Bombah Gulf is a protected area of Libya, which covers 1065 km^{2}.
