= Ain Elshakika Wetland =

Coordinates: 32°46′N 21°21′E

Designations

Ramsar Wetland
- Official name: Ain Elshakika
- Designated: 5 April 2000
- Reference no.: 1026

Ain Elshakika Wetland is a Ramsar-protected wetland of Libya within the El Kouf National Park. The wetland reserve was established in 2000, and covers an area of 33 hectares (82 acres). The site consists of a hypersaline coastal sebkha with limestone rock formations to the south, dunes and mudflats with extensive shrubs from west to east.

Vegetation on the inland side consists of a fringe of tamarix, mixed with freshwater-loving plants such as juncus.

The site connects in two points to the sea: in winter at high tide, seawater reaches the sebkha and raises the water level to about one meter, though freshwater springs locally decrease the salinity to some degree. In summer, the sebkha's water level is below sea level, but never fully dries. The site is an important wetland for migratory and resident waterbirds. It has national importance for the redshank and potential importance for curlew, dunlin (Calidris alpina) and slender-billed gulls (Chroicocephalus genei).
