= Zellaf Reserve =

Protected area in Libya

Zellaf Reserve (Arabic: زلاف) is a protected reserve of Libya.
