= Taizerbo =

Taizerbo is a proposed protected area of Libya. According to data of the World Database on Protected Areas (WDPA) published by the United Nations this small protected area (surface 0.3 km^{2}) has not yet been established in 2014. The name Taizerbo is an alternative spelling of Tazirbu.
