= Cinyps (Libya) =

River in ancient Libya

Coordinates: 32°32′N 14°27′E

The Cinyps (Ancient Greek: Κίνυψ) or Cinyphus (Κίνυφος), was a small river in ancient Libya, and the site of a Greek colony of the same name, founded by the Spartan Dorieus. The town only existed for a short time, due to conflicts with the Carthaginians, and the local tribe of the Macae. Today the river is known as the Wadi Caam or Ka'am.

== Sources ==
The source of the river is in the eighty-kilometer long Wadi Taraglat, at the coastal end of the Wadi. Herodotus erroneously stated that the source was near the Hill of Graces, some two hundred and sixty kilometers inland.

== History ==
The Greek colony of Cinyps was established by Dorieus of Sparta around 515 or 514 BC. Angered by the choice of Cleomenes as king of Sparta, Dorieus left the Peloponnese with a group of like-minded Spartans, with the aide of guides from Thera. The new town was founded at the mouth of the Cinyps. Herodotus described this region as "the fairest part of Libya".

The colony was expelled by the Carthaginians, along with the local tribe of the Macae, after a short duration of about three years. The Phoenician colony of Leptis Magna was nearby, and the Greek town was probably seen as a threat. The Macae were a local Libyan tribe, and were employed as mercenaries by the Carthaginians.

At a later time, when Leptis Magna was part of the Roman Empire, springs in the Cinyps were the source of the water used in the Hadrianic baths. The water was diverted using an aqueduct built by Quintus Servillius Candidus from AD 119 to 120.

== Mythology ==
In Greek mythology, Guneus, one of the surviving combatants from the Trojan War, is said to have gone to Libya and settled near the Cinyps, although other traditions have him drowning at sea.

== Archaeology ==
Archaeologists have uncovered a Greek necropolis dating from the third century BC in the modern Wadi Caam. The cemetery consists of a series of box-shaped stone urns, with lids in the shape of a sloping roof, containing ashes and bones. Various types of ceramics have also been found.
