= Fezzan valleys =

Protected area in Libya

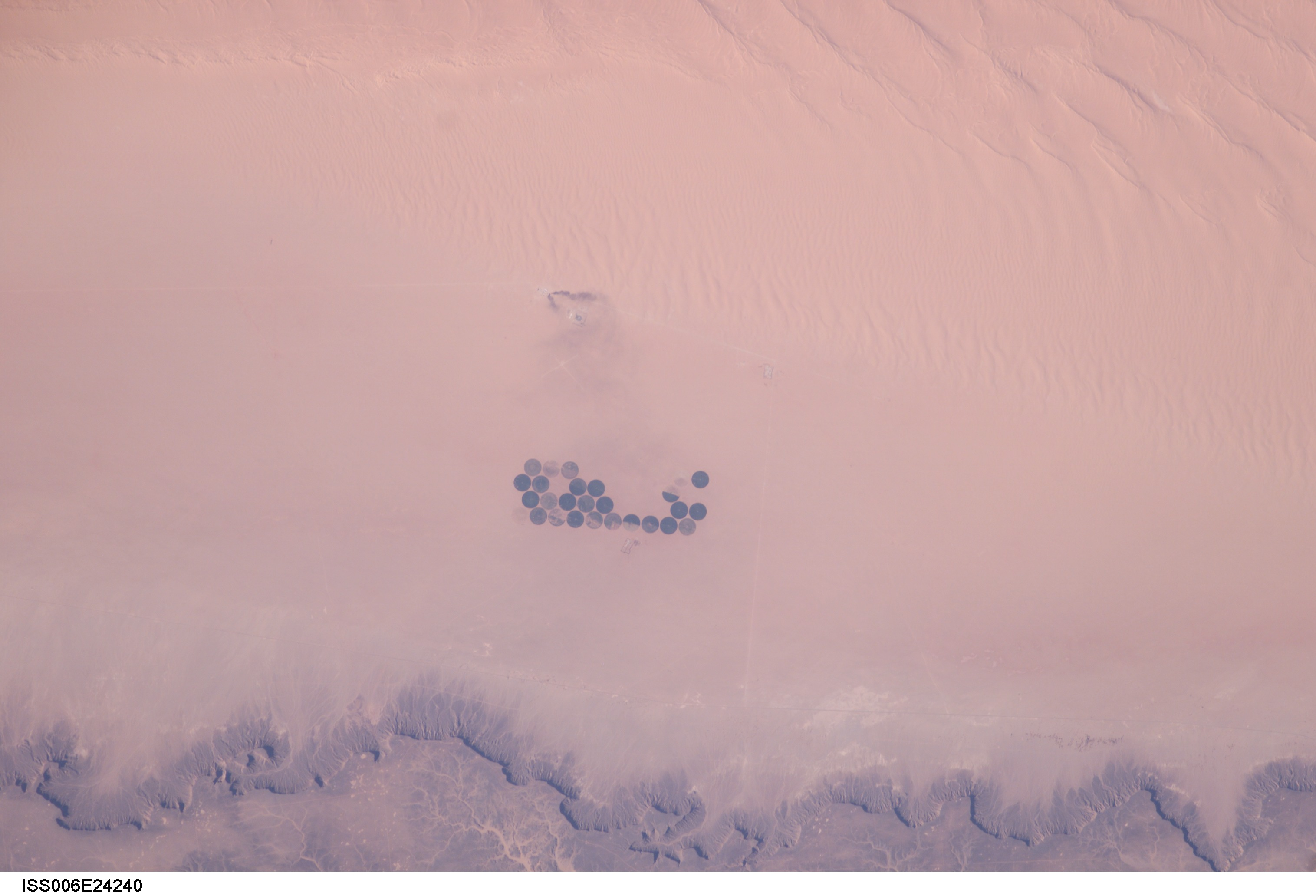
- Aerial shot of center pivot irrigation in Wadi Irawan
- Location: Wadi al Hayaa and Wadi al Shatii Districts, Libya
- Nearest city: Sabha (largest)

Location of the valleys in Libya

Fezzan Valleys is a protected area of Libya made up of Wadi ash-Shati' (ash-Shati Valley) and Wadi Irawan (Irawan Valley), located in the southwestern region of modern Libya, constitute a protected area. The region is predominantly desert but contains mountains, uplands, and dry river valleys (wadis) in the north, where oases support ancient towns. Fezzan's climate is extreme, characterized by very hot summers and cool winters, with scarce rainfall. The valleys play a crucial role in the region's connectivity, serving as entry points from the north to towns like Waddan, Sawknah, and Hun, linking Fezzan to other parts of Libya.
