= Castelverde, Libya =

Castelverde القره بوللي Gasr Garabulli
- Town
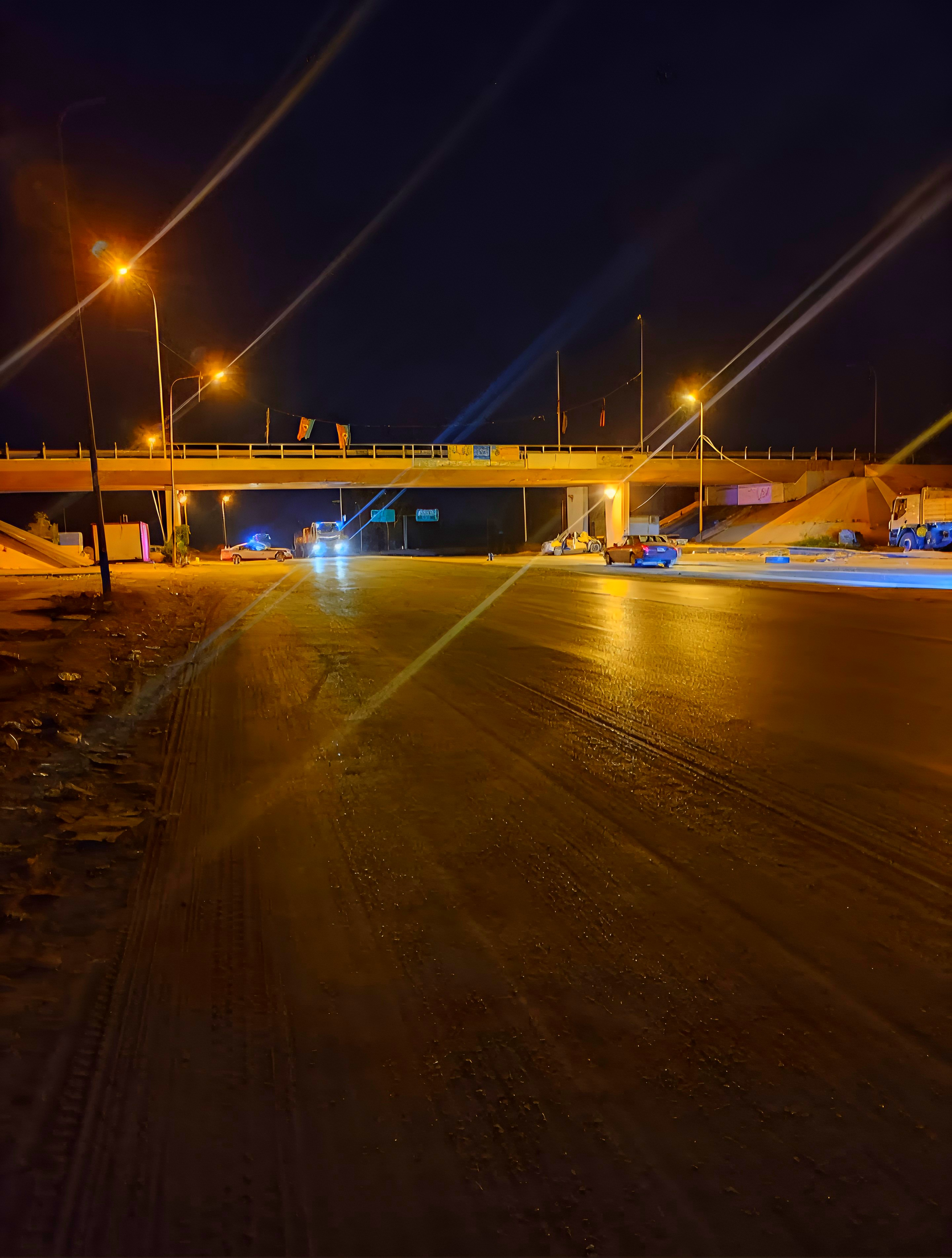

- Location in Libya
- Coordinates: 32°45′00″N 13°43′00″E
- Country: Libya
- Region: Tripolitania
- District: Tripoli
- Elevation: 108 ft (33 m)

Population (1995)
  - Total: 34,584
- Time zone: UTC + 2
- License Plate Code: 46

Castelverde, also named Gasr Garabulli, is a town in the Tripoli District (Tarabulus), of the Tripolitania region in northwestern Libya.

From 2001 to 2007 it was part of the Tajura wa Al Nawahi AlArba‘ District, which then was merged into Tripoli District.

== History ==
Castelverde was founded as a colonial settlement in Italian Libya, and is a namesake of the town Castelverde in Lombardy, Italy.

In June 2016, citizens took up arms to defend against a militia from the nearby city of Misrata after a dispute developed between them. During the conflict, a large blast killed 25 people.

It is popular for its sandy beaches and considered the best rated beach in the country by its people and visitors

== Geography ==
The town is situated on the main road between Tripoli and Khoms, Libya, near the Mediterranean Sea coast. The new Libyan railway line passes through Castelverde.

== See also ==
- Railway stations in Libya
