= Berjuj Valley =

Protected area in Libya

- Location: Libya

Berjuj Valley is a protected area of Libya.
