= Mordellistena michalki =

Scientific classification
- Kingdom: Animalia
- Phylum: Arthropoda
- Clade: Pancrustacea
- Class: Insecta
- Order: Coleoptera
- Suborder: Polyphaga
- Infraorder: Cucujiformia
- Family: Mordellidae
- Genus: Mordellistena
- Species: M. michalki

Binomial name
- Mordellistena michalki Ermisch, 1956

Species of beetle

Mordellistena michalki is a species of beetle in the genus Mordellistena of the family Mordellidae. It was described by Ermisch in 1956, and can be found in such countries as Austria, Bosnia and Herzegovina, Czech Republic, Germany, Slovakia and North Macedonia.
