= Mordellistena manteroi =

Scientific classification
- Domain: Eukaryota
- Kingdom: Animalia
- Phylum: Arthropoda
- Class: Insecta
- Order: Coleoptera
- Suborder: Polyphaga
- Infraorder: Cucujiformia
- Family: Mordellidae
- Genus: Mordellistena
- Species: M. manteroi

Binomial name
- Mordellistena manteroi Costa, 1854

Species of beetle

Mordellistena manteroi is a species of beetles is the family Mordellidae.
