= Mordellistena peloponnesensis =

Scientific classification
- Domain: Eukaryota
- Kingdom: Animalia
- Phylum: Arthropoda
- Class: Insecta
- Order: Coleoptera
- Suborder: Polyphaga
- Infraorder: Cucujiformia
- Family: Mordellidae
- Genus: Mordellistena
- Species: M. peloponnesensis

Binomial name
- Mordellistena peloponnesensis Batten, 1980

Species of beetle

Mordellistena peloponnesensis is a species of beetle in the genus Mordellistena of the family Mordellidae. It was described by Batten in 1980 and can be found on the islands such as Crete and Cyprus, Mediterranean part of Greece and Near East.
