= Mordellistena menoko =

Scientific classification
- Domain: Eukaryota
- Kingdom: Animalia
- Phylum: Arthropoda
- Class: Insecta
- Order: Coleoptera
- Suborder: Polyphaga
- Infraorder: Cucujiformia
- Family: Mordellidae
- Genus: Mordellistena
- Species: M. menoko

Binomial name
- Mordellistena menoko Kôno, 1932

Species of beetle

Mordellistena menoko is a species of beetle in the genus Mordellistena of the family Mordellidae. It was discovered in 1932, and in some online catalogs is given as the revised combination Pseudotolida menoko (Kôno, 1932).
