= Mordellistena balcanica =

Scientific classification
- Domain: Eukaryota
- Kingdom: Animalia
- Phylum: Arthropoda
- Class: Insecta
- Order: Coleoptera
- Suborder: Polyphaga
- Infraorder: Cucujiformia
- Family: Mordellidae
- Genus: Mordellistena
- Species: M. balcanica

Binomial name
- Mordellistena balcanica Ermisch, 1967

Species of beetle

Mordellistena balcanica is a species of beetle in the genus Mordellistena of the family Mordellidae. It was described in 1967 and can be found in Bulgaria and Republic of Macedonia.
