= Mordellistena lucidovirga =

Scientific classification
- Kingdom: Animalia
- Phylum: Arthropoda
- Clade: Pancrustacea
- Class: Insecta
- Order: Coleoptera
- Suborder: Polyphaga
- Infraorder: Cucujiformia
- Family: Mordellidae
- Genus: Mordellistena
- Species: M. lucidovirga

Binomial name
- Mordellistena lucidovirga Ray, 1937

Species of beetle

Mordellistena lucidovirga is a species of beetle in the family Mordellidae. It was described in 1937 by Eugene Ray from Puerto Rico.

This beetle measures 2.15 mm (0.085 in) in length, or 3 mm (0.12 in) when including the anal stylus. The antennae are 0.75 mm (0.030 in) long.
