= Mordellistena flavospinosa =

Scientific classification
- Domain: Eukaryota
- Kingdom: Animalia
- Phylum: Arthropoda
- Class: Insecta
- Order: Coleoptera
- Suborder: Polyphaga
- Infraorder: Cucujiformia
- Family: Mordellidae
- Genus: Mordellistena
- Species: M. flavospinosa

Binomial name
- Mordellistena flavospinosa Hubenthal, 1911

Species of beetle

Mordellistena flavospinosa is a beetle in the genus Mordellistena of the family Mordellidae. It was described in 1911 by Hubenthal.
