= Mordellistena nunenmacheri =

Scientific classification
- Domain: Eukaryota
- Kingdom: Animalia
- Phylum: Arthropoda
- Class: Insecta
- Order: Coleoptera
- Suborder: Polyphaga
- Infraorder: Cucujiformia
- Family: Mordellidae
- Genus: Mordellistena
- Species: M. nunenmacheri

Binomial name
- Mordellistena nunenmacheri Liljebald (1918)

Species of beetle

Mordellistena nunenmacheri is a species of beetle in the genus Mordellistena of the family Mordellidae. It was described by Liljebald in 1918.
