= Mordellistena dvoraki =

Scientific classification
- Domain: Eukaryota
- Kingdom: Animalia
- Phylum: Arthropoda
- Class: Insecta
- Order: Coleoptera
- Suborder: Polyphaga
- Infraorder: Cucujiformia
- Family: Mordellidae
- Genus: Mordellistena
- Species: M. dvoraki

Binomial name
- Mordellistena dvoraki Ermisch, 1956

Species of beetle

Mordellistena dvoraki is a species of beetle in the genus Mordellistena of the family Mordellidae. It was described in 1956 by Ermisch and can be found in such European countries as Bulgaria, Czech Republic, France, Germany, Hungary, Poland, Republic of Macedonia and Slovakia.
