= Mordellistena praesagita =

Scientific classification
- Domain: Eukaryota
- Kingdom: Animalia
- Phylum: Arthropoda
- Class: Insecta
- Order: Coleoptera
- Suborder: Polyphaga
- Infraorder: Cucujiformia
- Family: Mordellidae
- Genus: Mordellistena
- Species: M. praesagita

Binomial name
- Mordellistena praesagita Kangas, 1988

Species of beetle

Mordellistena praesagita is a species of beetle in the genus Mordellistena of the family Mordellidae. It was described by Kangas in 1988.
