= Mordellistena lindbergi =

Scientific classification
- Kingdom: Animalia
- Phylum: Arthropoda
- Clade: Pancrustacea
- Class: Insecta
- Order: Coleoptera
- Suborder: Polyphaga
- Infraorder: Cucujiformia
- Family: Mordellidae
- Genus: Mordellistena
- Species: M. lindbergi

Binomial name
- Mordellistena lindbergi Ermisch, 1963

Species of beetle

Mordellistena lindbergi is a beetle in the genus Mordellistena of the family Mordellidae. It was described in 1963 by Ermisch.
