= Mordellistena turkmenica =

Scientific classification
- Kingdom: Animalia
- Phylum: Arthropoda
- Class: Insecta
- Order: Coleoptera
- Suborder: Polyphaga
- Infraorder: Cucujiformia
- Family: Mordellidae
- Genus: Mordellistena
- Species: M. turkmenica

Binomial name
- Mordellistena turkmenica Odnosum, 2003

Species of beetle

Mordellistena turkmenica is a species of beetle in the Mordellistena genus that is in the Mordellidae family. It was discovered in 2003.
