= Mordellistena leai =

Scientific classification
- Kingdom: Animalia
- Phylum: Arthropoda
- Clade: Pancrustacea
- Class: Insecta
- Order: Coleoptera
- Suborder: Polyphaga
- Infraorder: Cucujiformia
- Family: Mordellidae
- Genus: Mordellistena
- Species: M. leai

Binomial name
- Mordellistena leai Ray, 1937

Species of beetle

Mordellistena leai is a species of beetle in the family Mordellidae. It was described in 1937 by Eugene Ray from Puerto Rico.

This beetle measures 2.4 mm (0.094 in) in length, or 3.6 mm (0.14 in) when including the anal stylus. The antennae are 1 mm (0.039 in) long.
