= Mordellistena podlussanyi =

Scientific classification
- Domain: Eukaryota
- Kingdom: Animalia
- Phylum: Arthropoda
- Class: Insecta
- Order: Coleoptera
- Suborder: Polyphaga
- Infraorder: Cucujiformia
- Family: Mordellidae
- Genus: Mordellistena
- Species: M. podlussanyi

Binomial name
- Mordellistena podlussanyi Csetó, 1990

Species of beetle

Mordellistena podlussanyi is a species of beetle in the genus Mordellistena of the family Mordellidae. It was described by Csetó in 1990.
