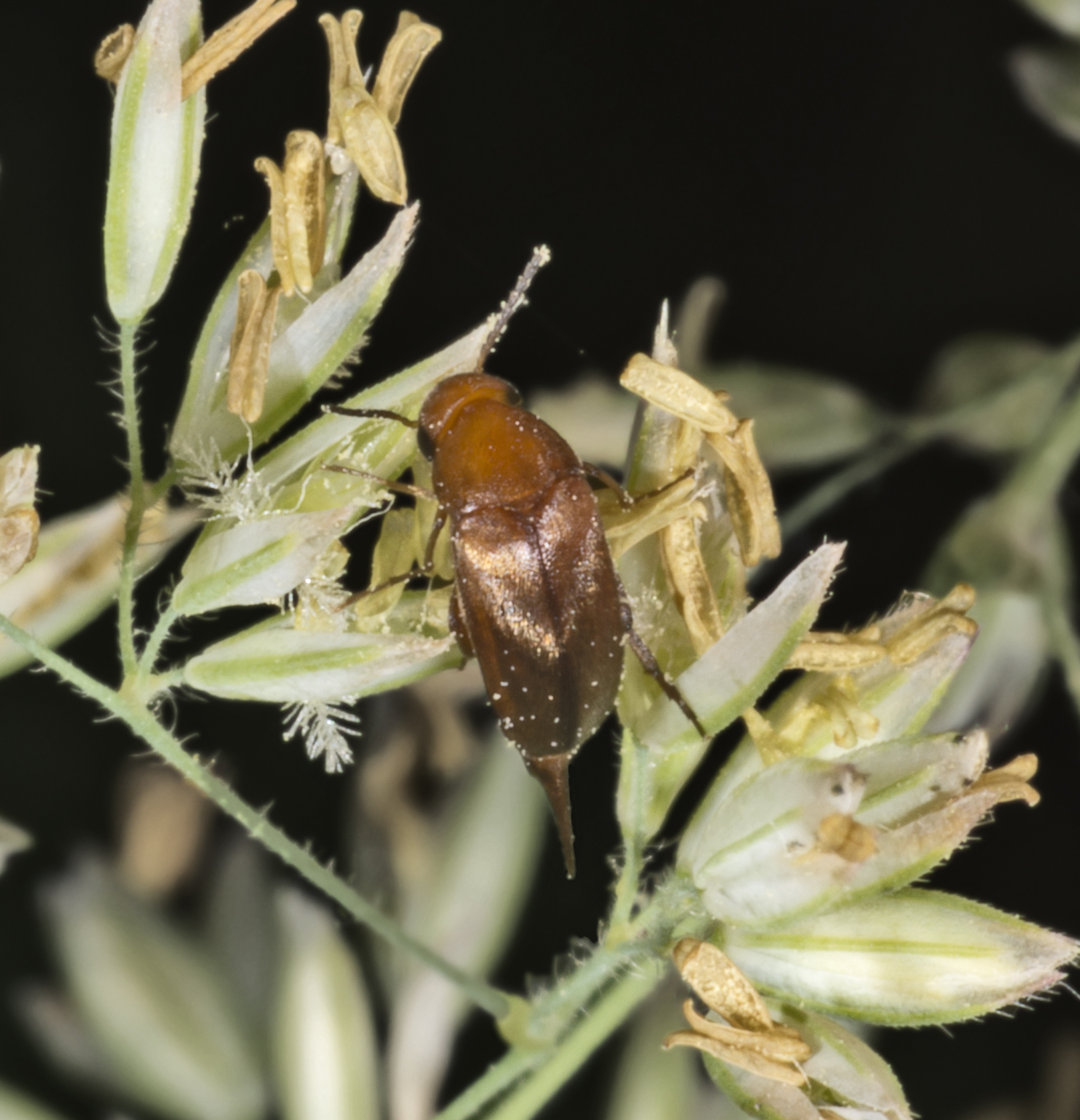
- Mordellistena neuwaldeggiana, France

Scientific classification
- Kingdom: Animalia
- Phylum: Arthropoda
- Class: Insecta
- Order: Coleoptera
- Suborder: Polyphaga
- Infraorder: Cucujiformia
- Family: Mordellidae
- Subfamily: Mordellinae
- Tribe: Mordellistenini
- Genus: Mordellistena; Costa, 1854

Type species
- Mordellistena confinis Costa, 1854

Synonyms
- Mordelistena; Mordelliatena; Mordellikoiles; Mordellokoides Franciscolo, 1942; Mordellokoiles Franciscolo, 1942; Natirrica Costa, 1854; Natrirrica Lacordaire, 1859; Pseudomordellina Ermisch, 1952

= Mordellistena =

Genus of beetles

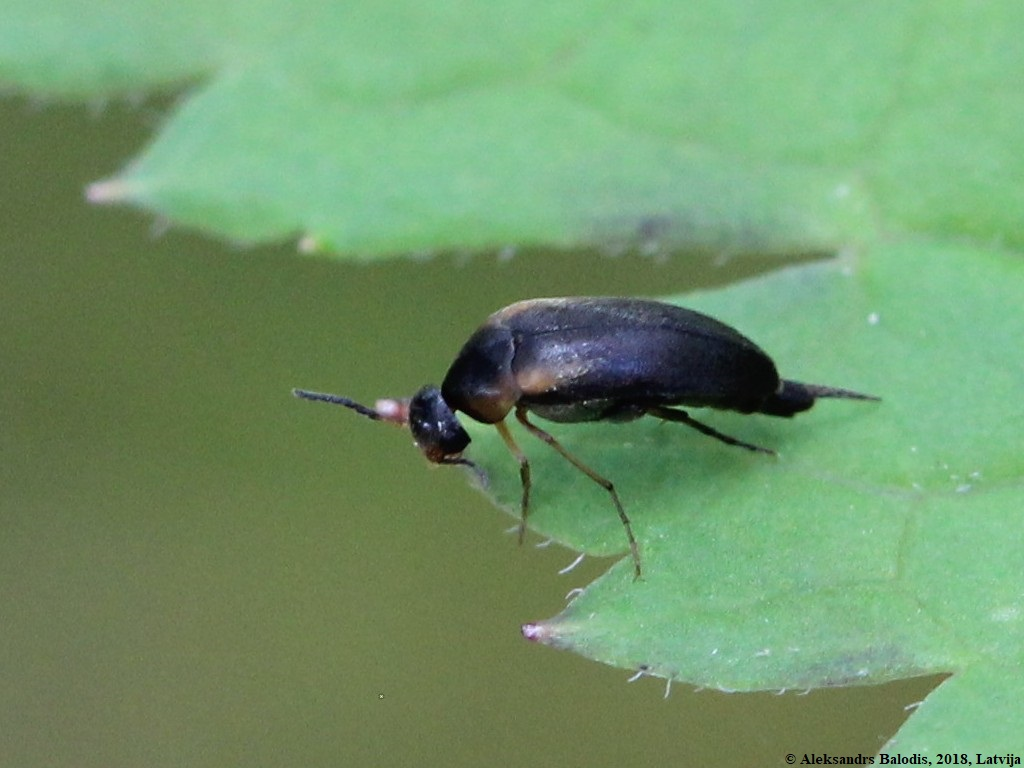
Mordellistena humeralis

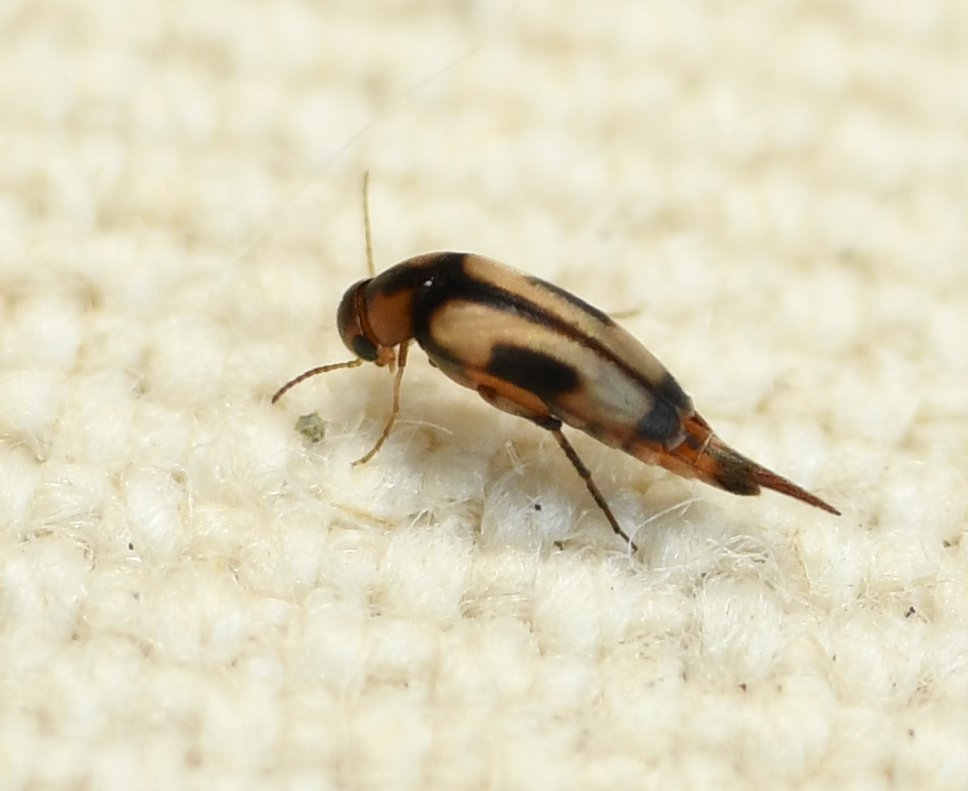
Mordellistena andreae, Florida

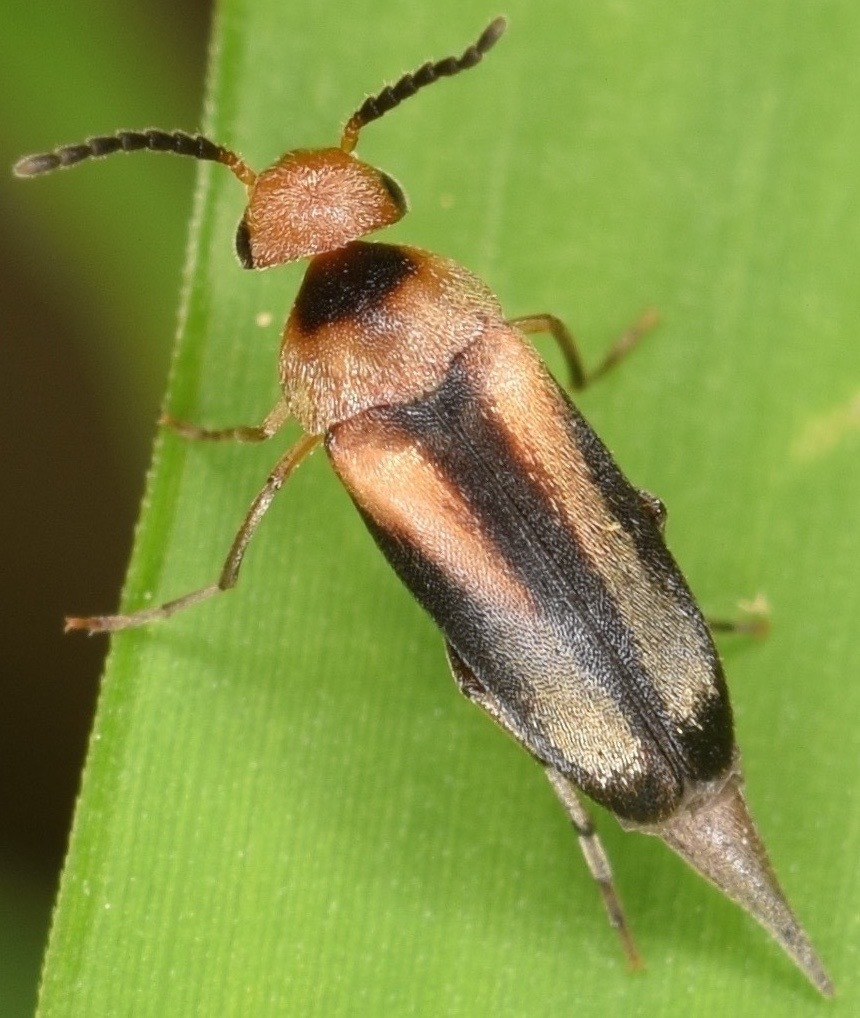
Mordellistena attenuata, Georgia

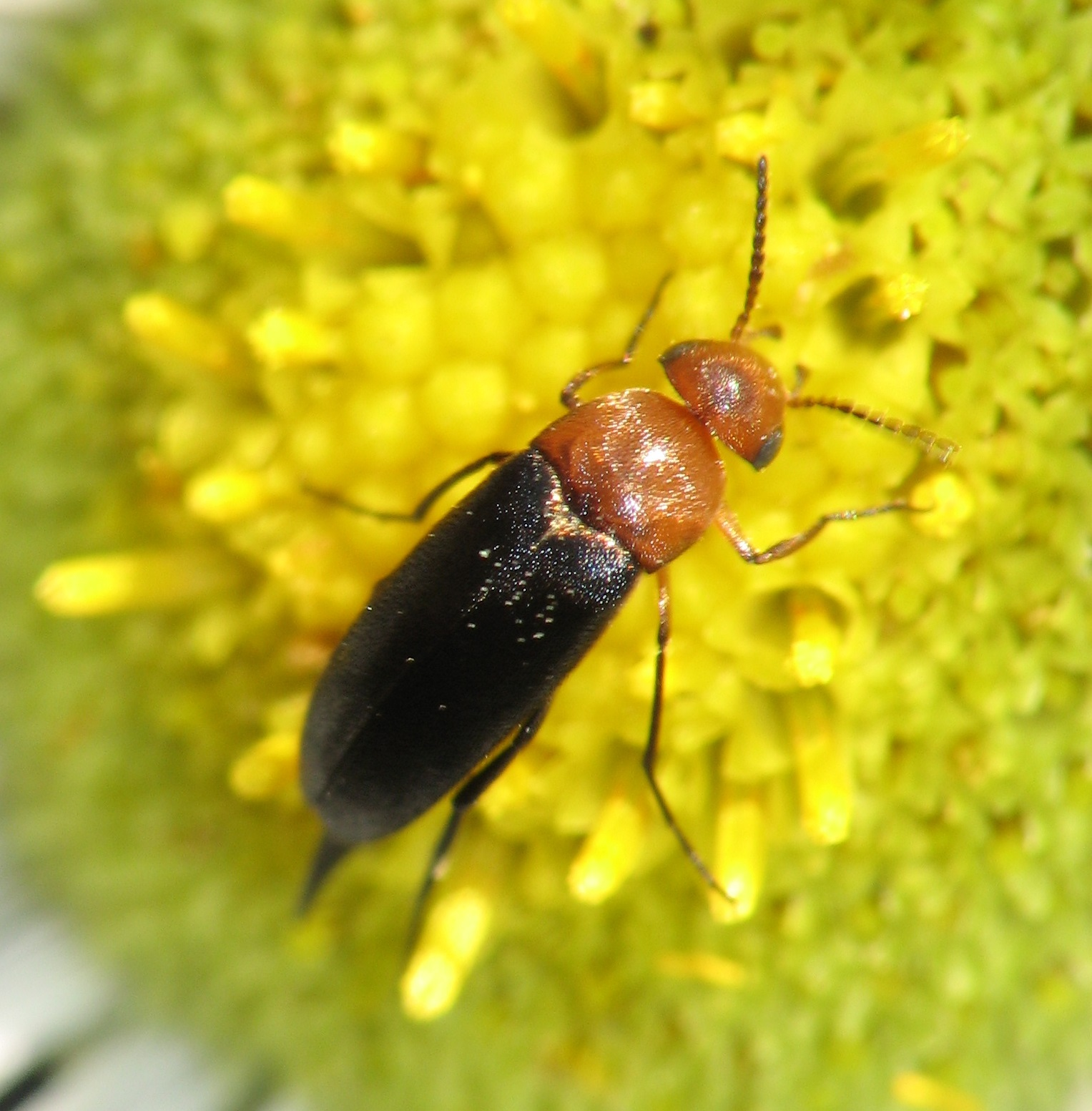
Mordellistena cervicalis, Pennsylvania

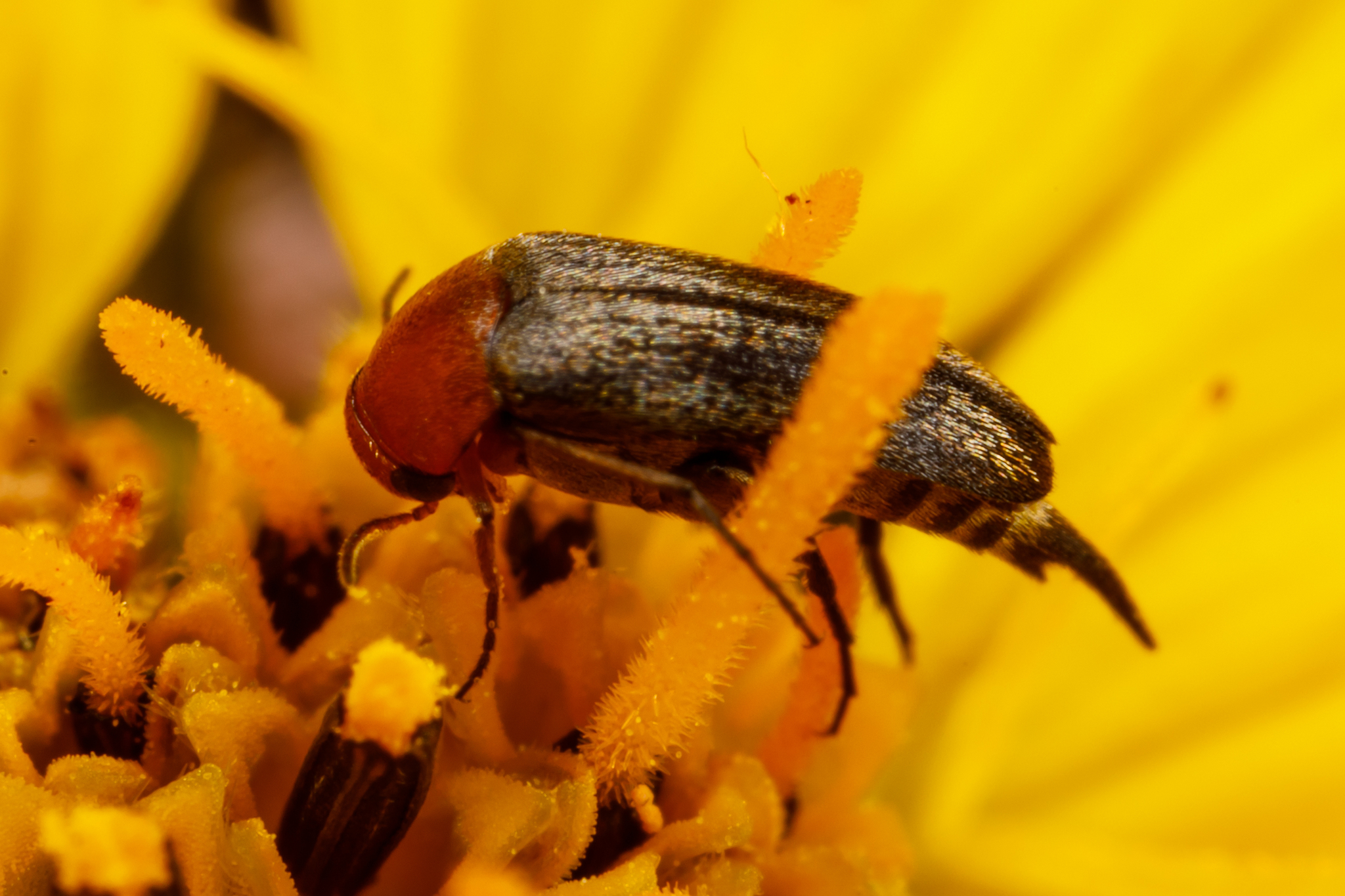
Mordellistena comata, Texas

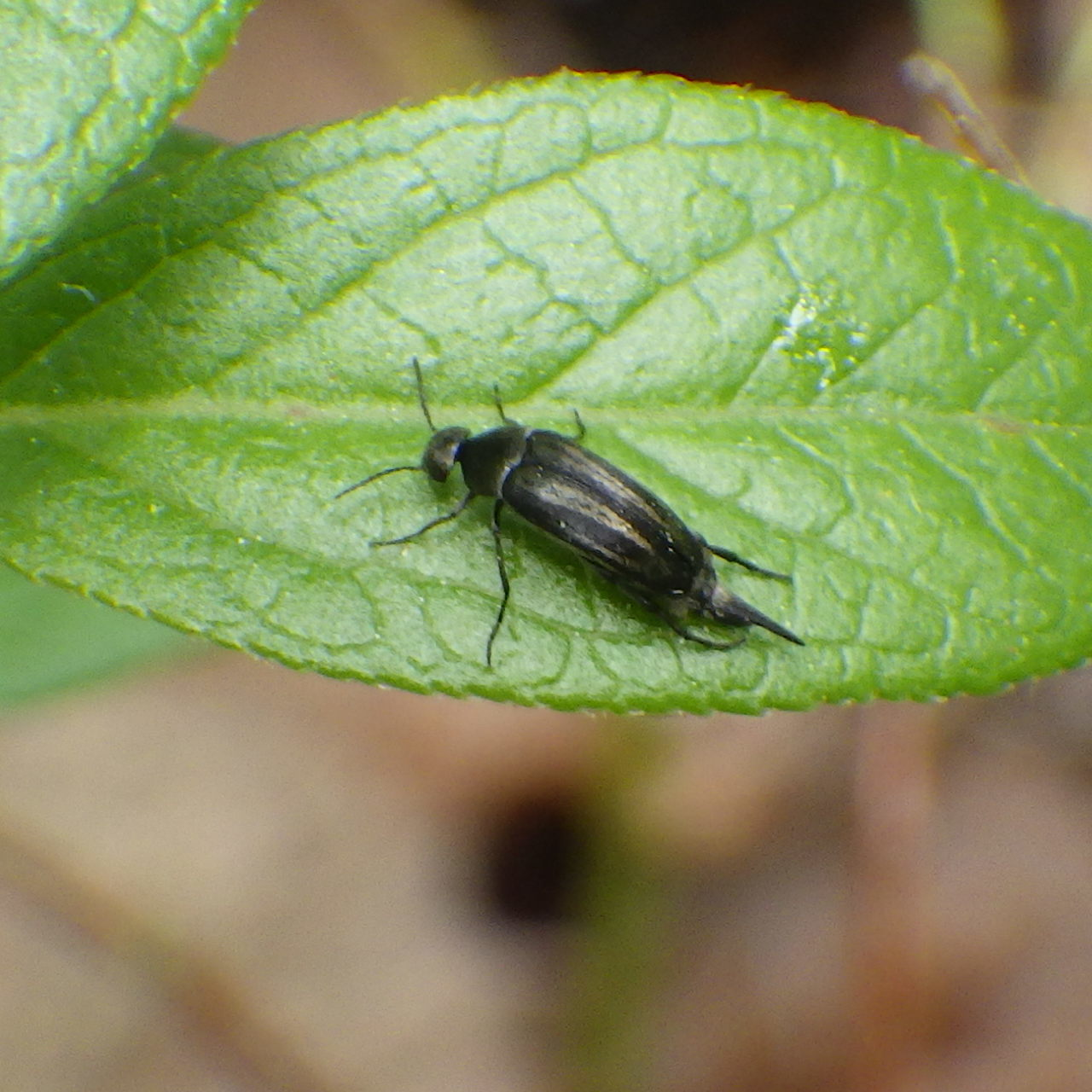
Mordellistena convicta, Canada

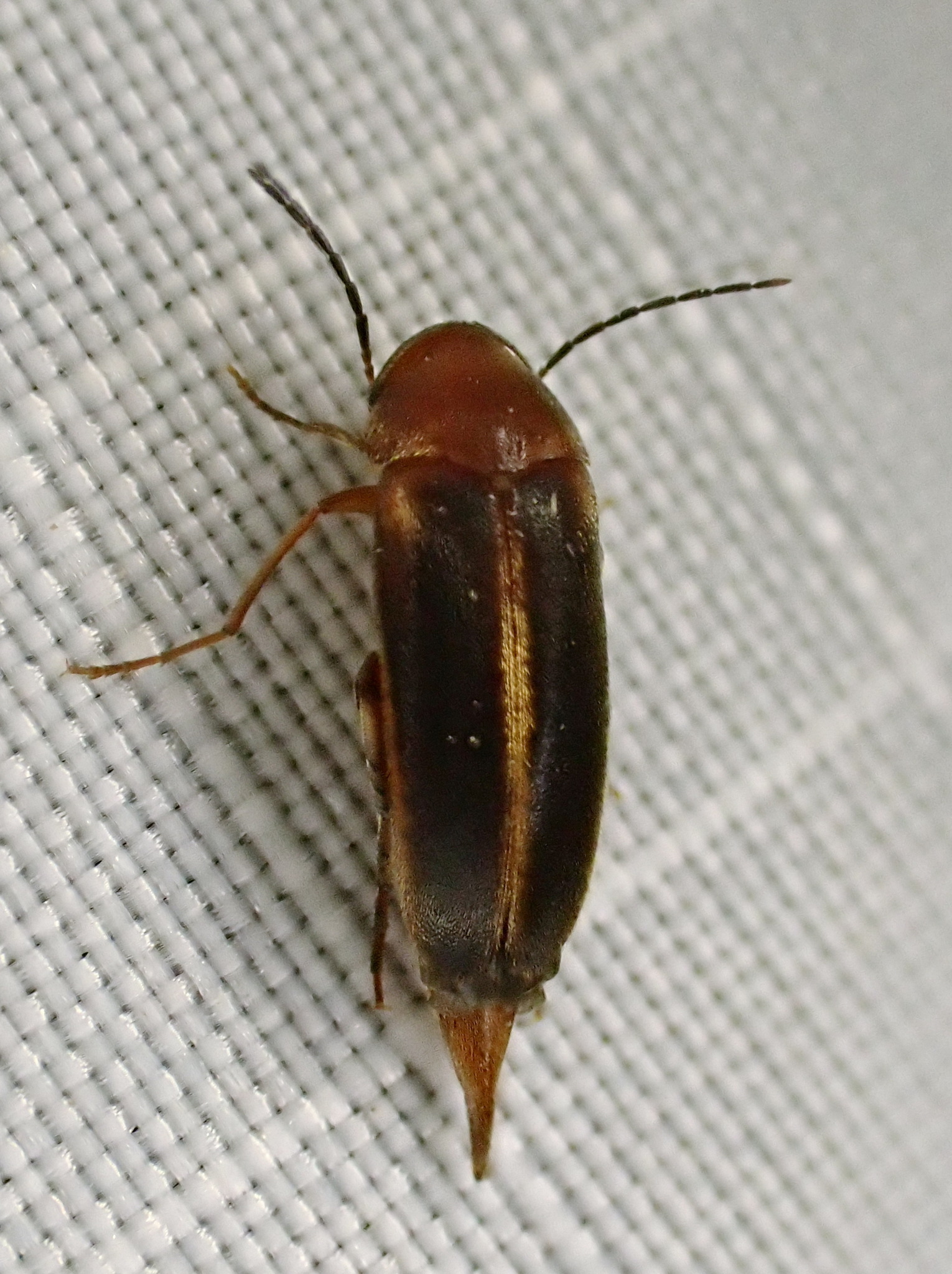
Mordellistena fuscipennis, Virginia

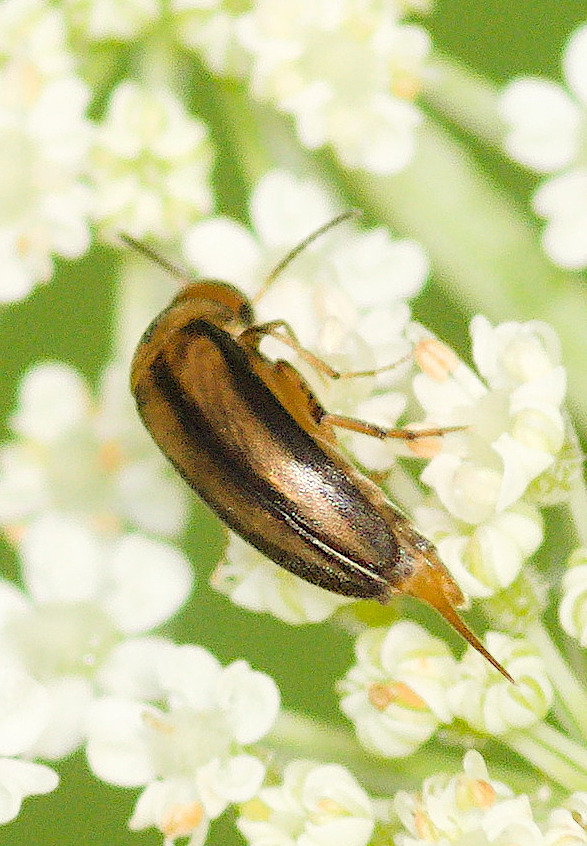
Mordellistena limbalis, Illinois

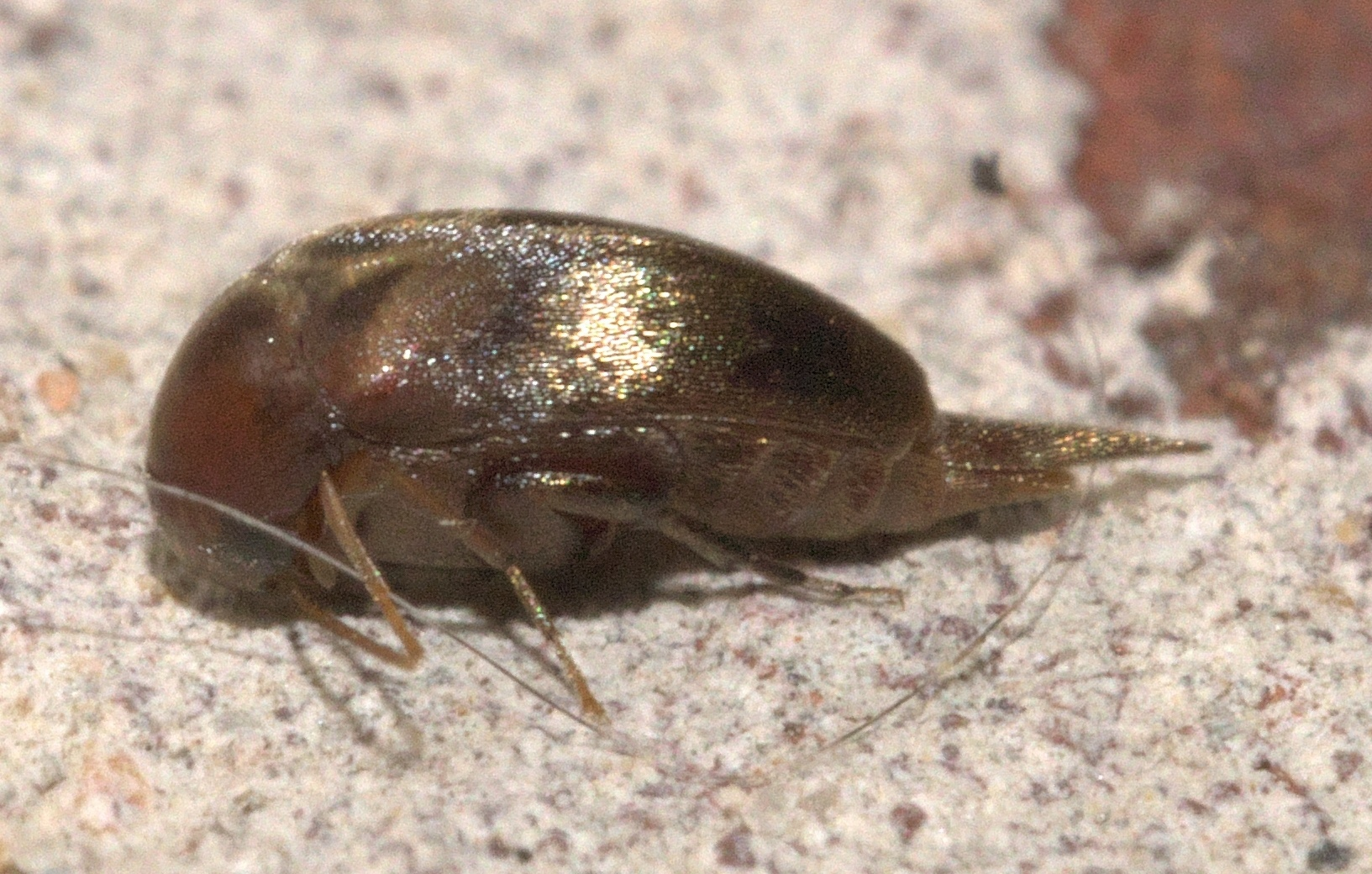
Mordellistena liturata, Oklahoma

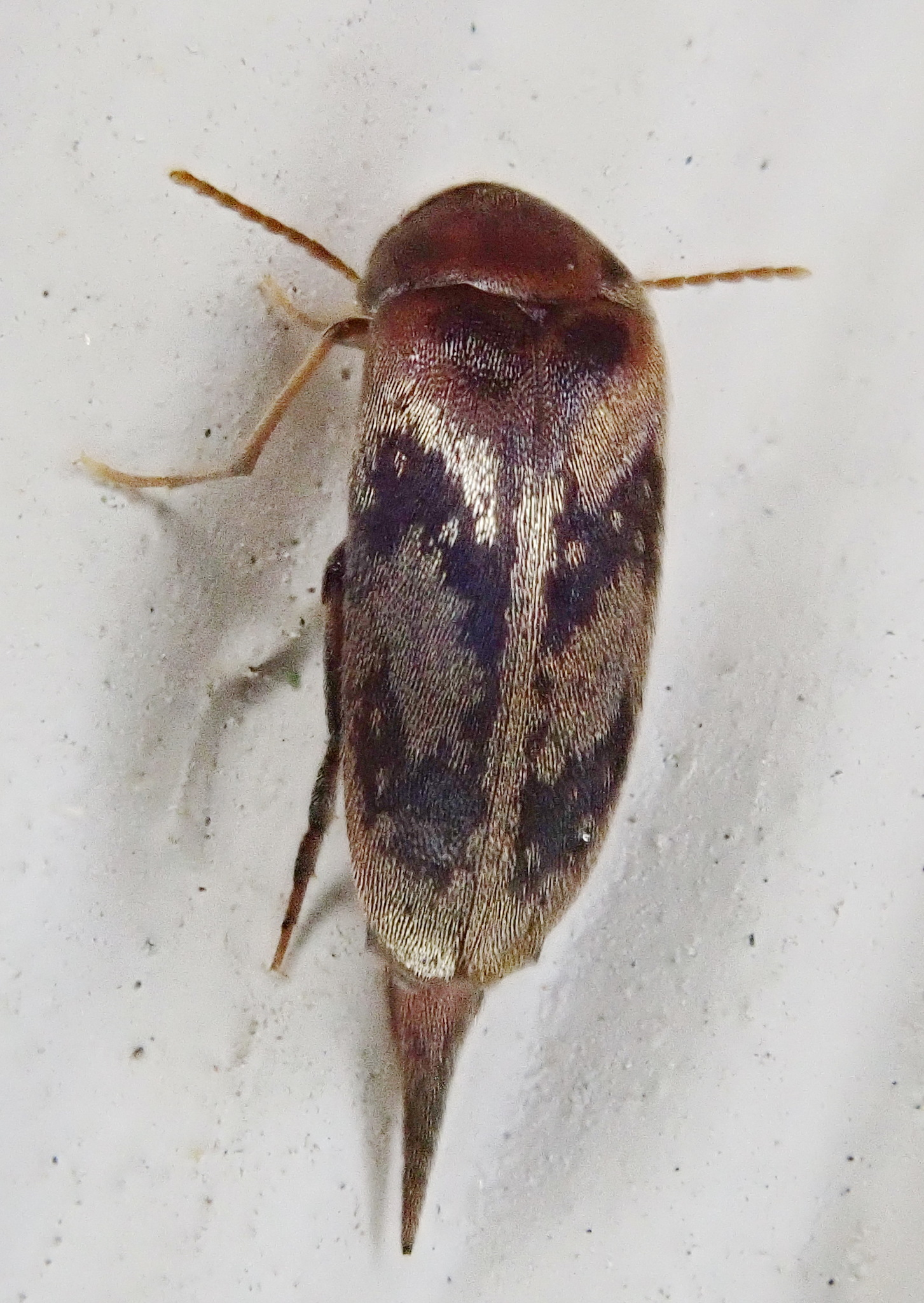
Mordellistena masoni, Virginia

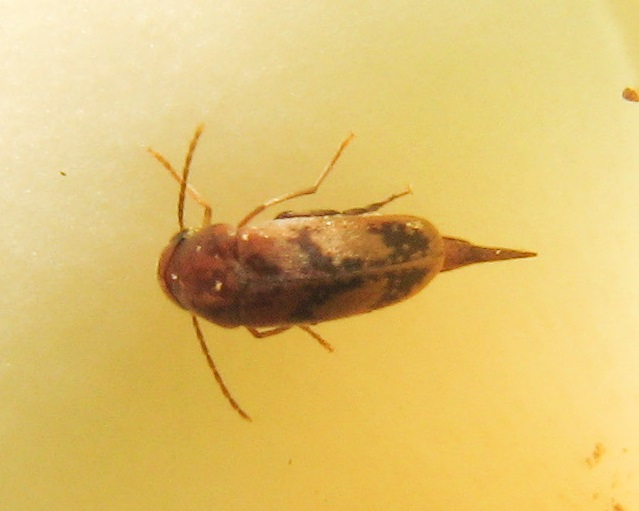
Mordellistena masoni

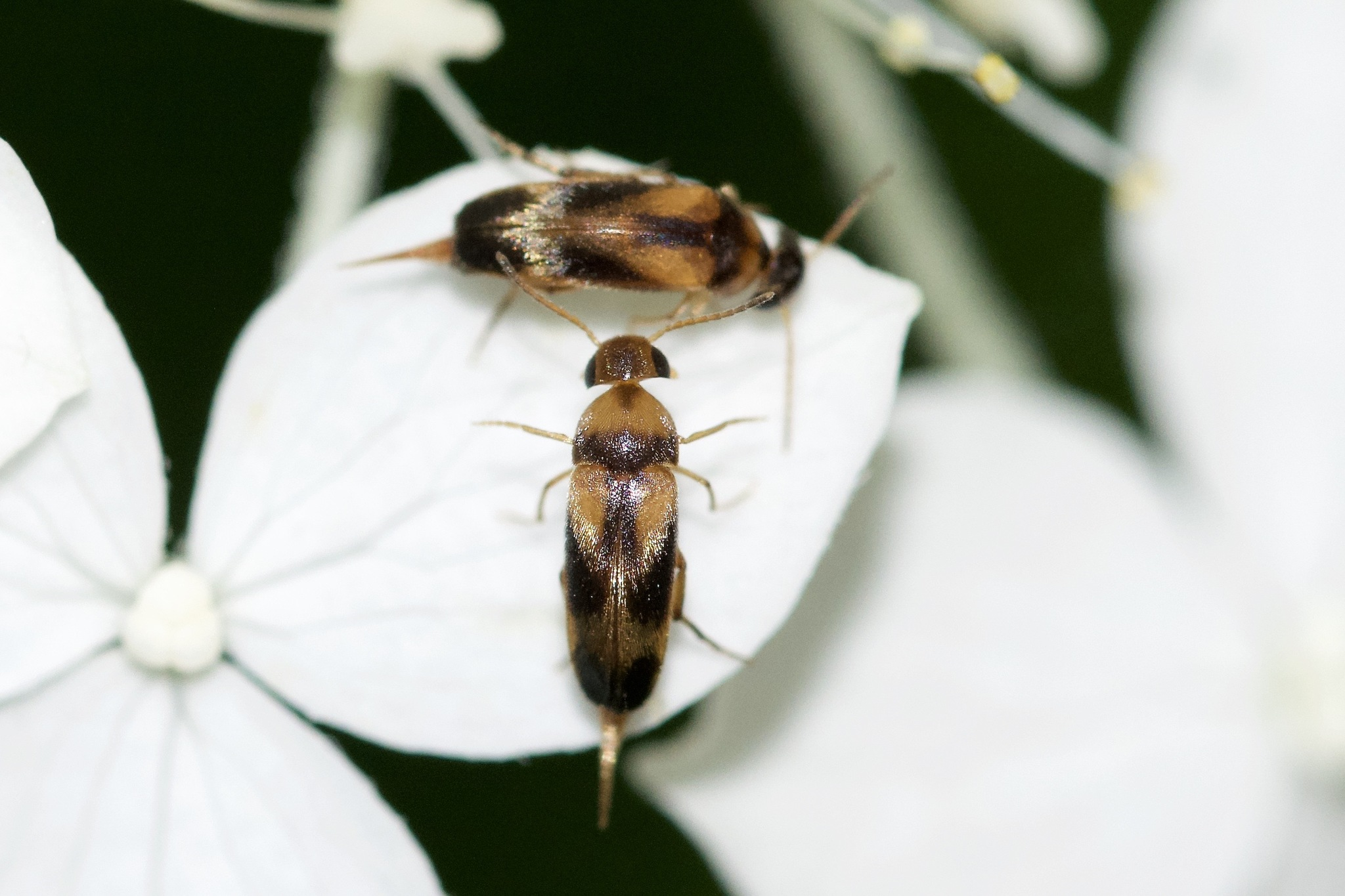
Mordellistena ornata, Canada

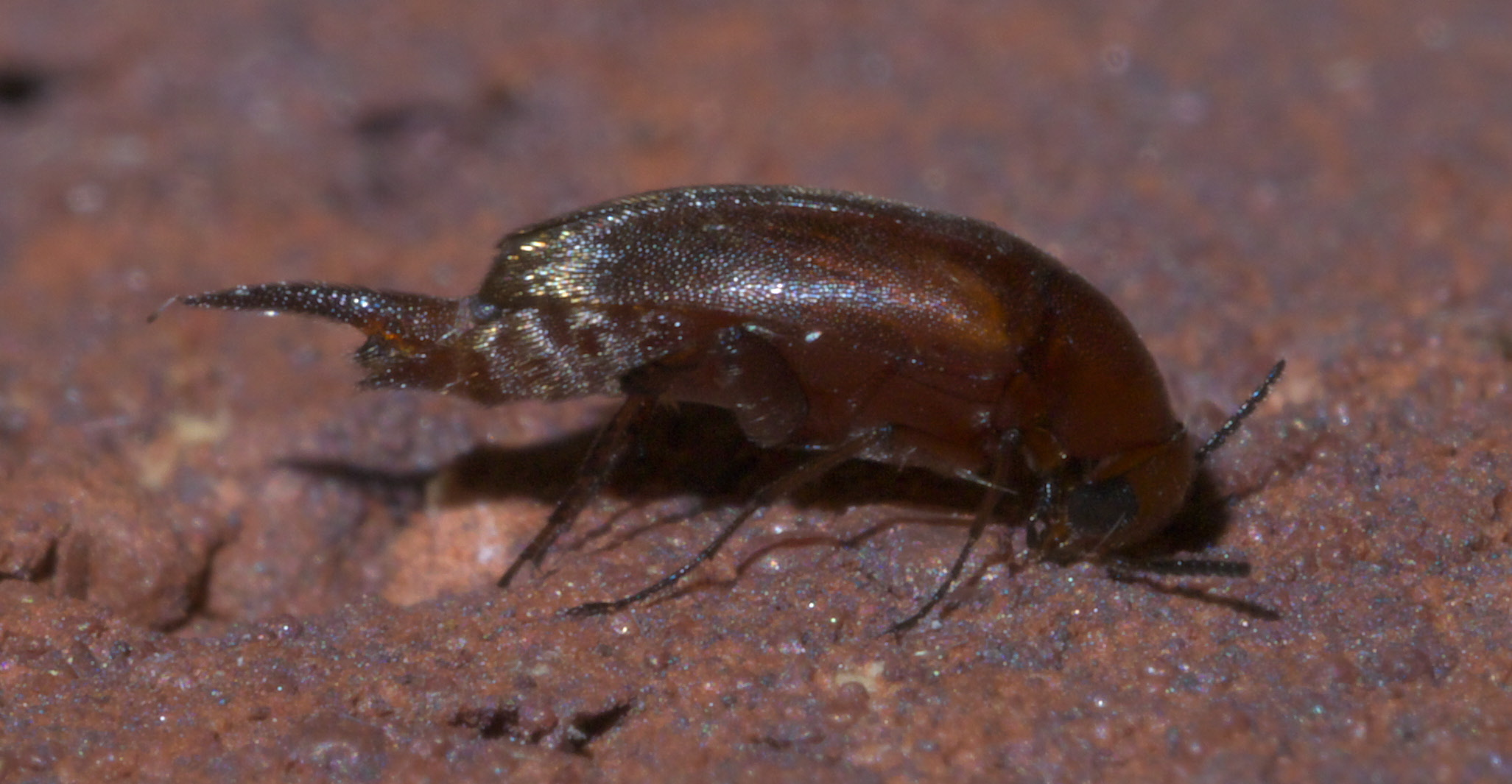
Mordellistena subfuscus, Oklahoma

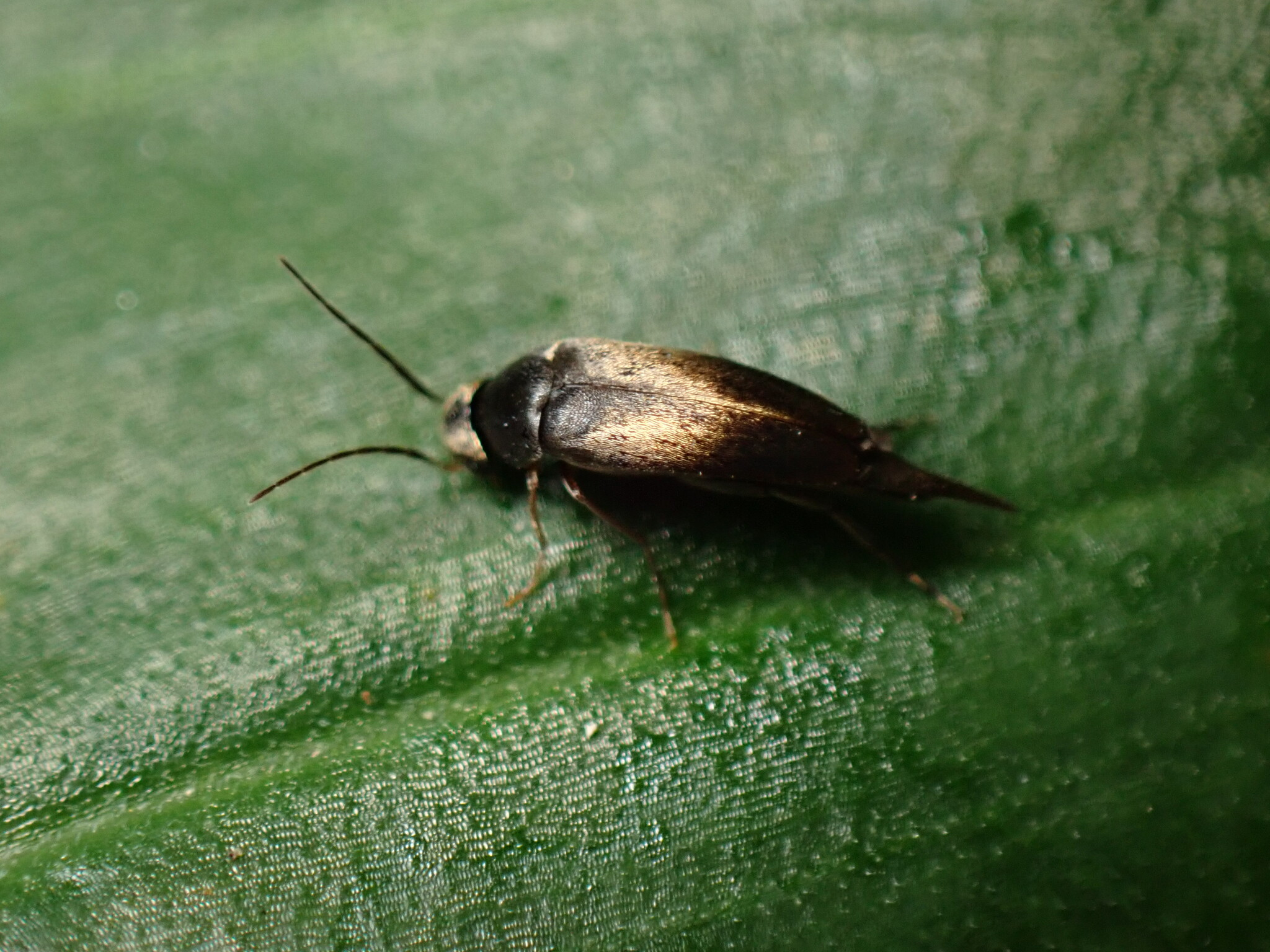
Mordellistena vera, New York

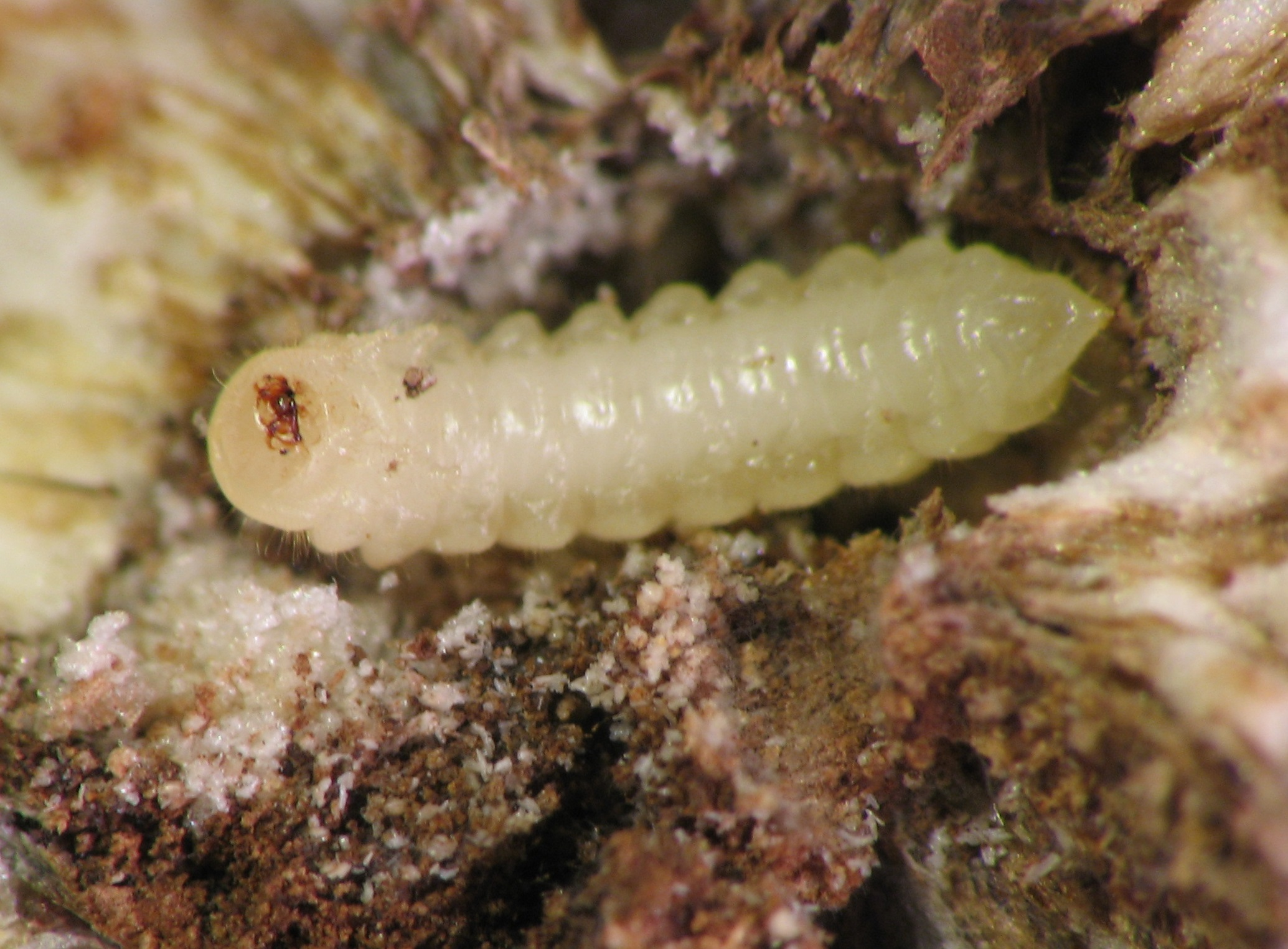
Mordellistena sp. larva

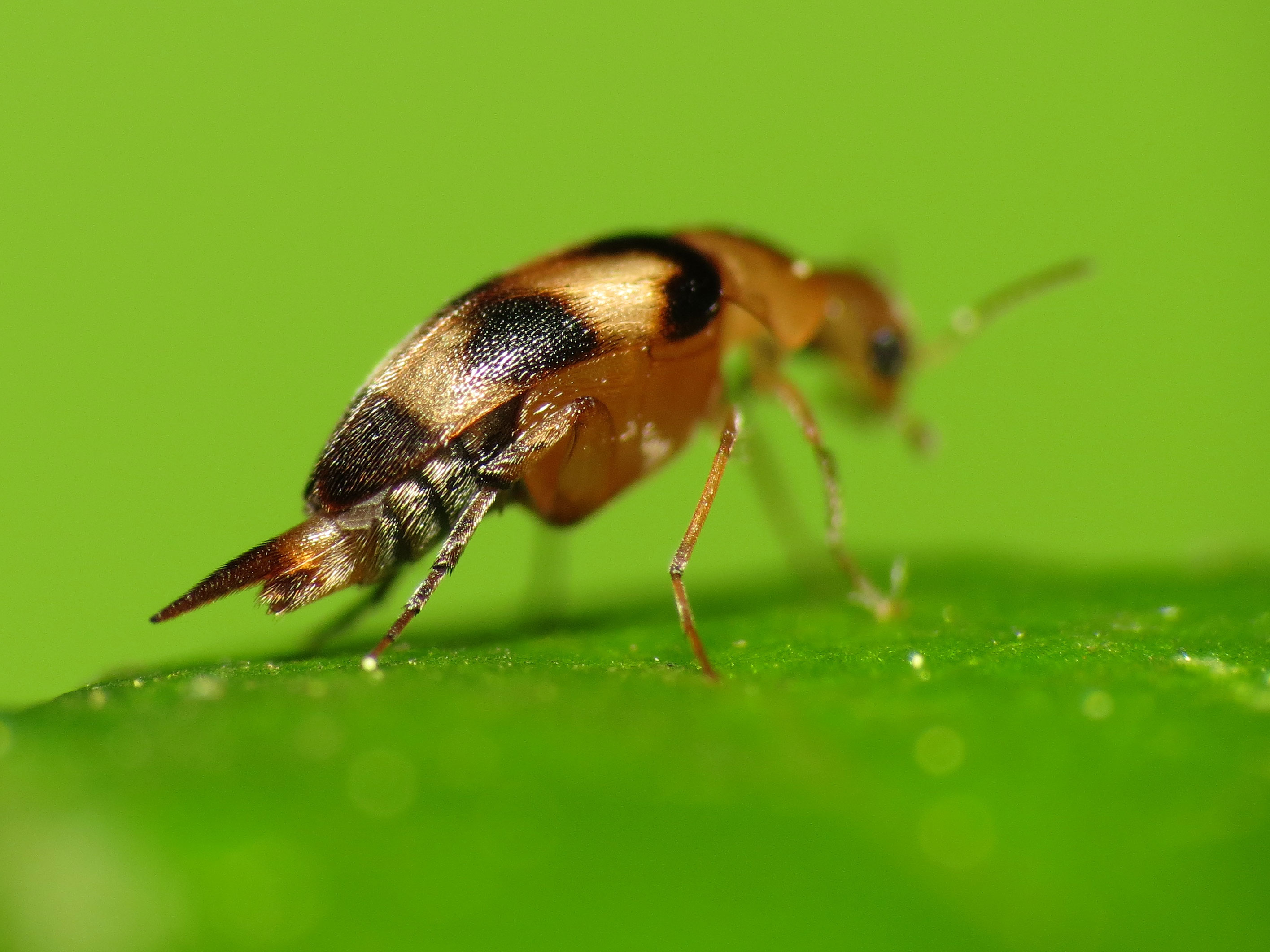
Mordellistena trifasciata

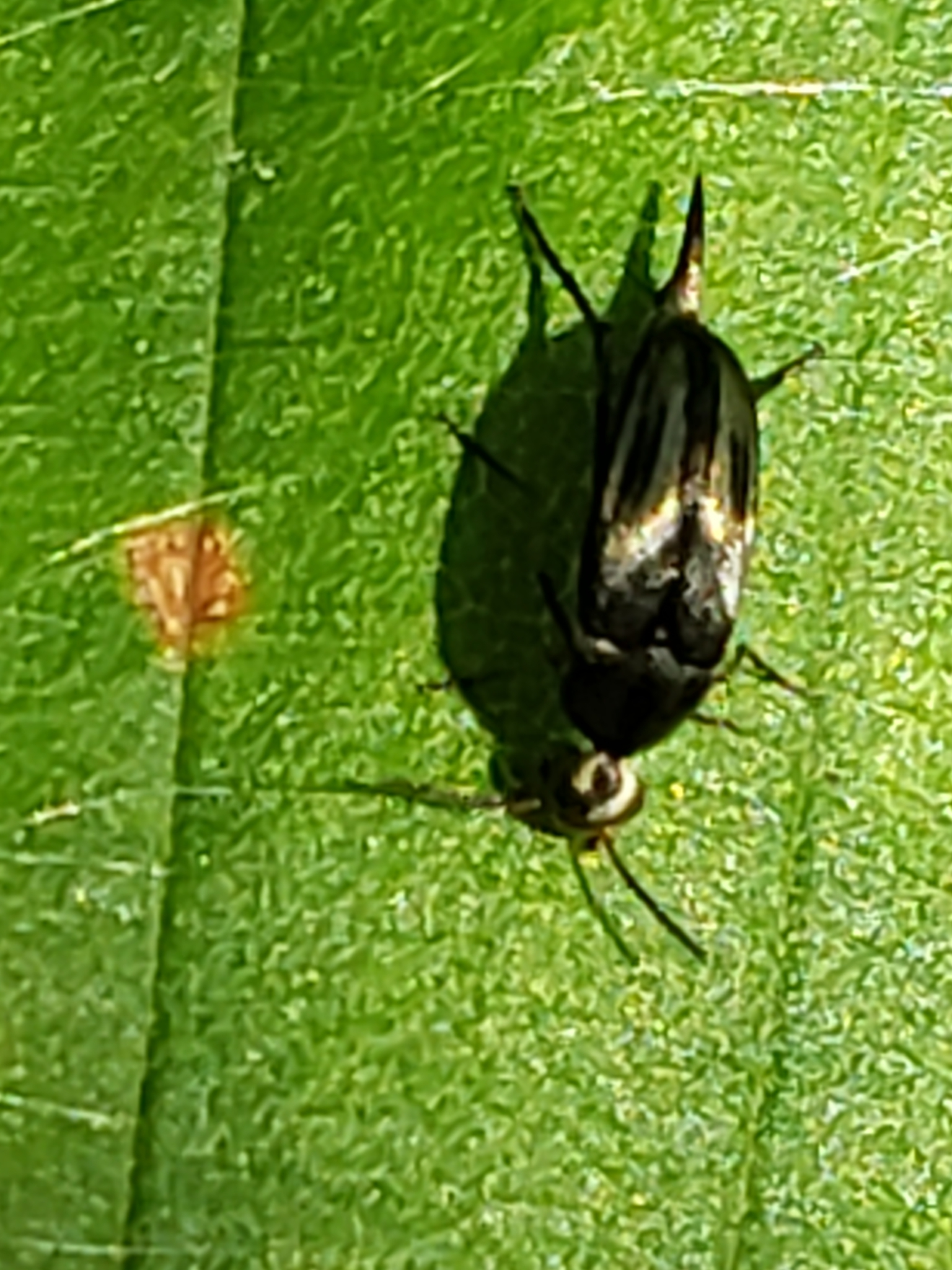
Mordellistena syntaenia, Virginia

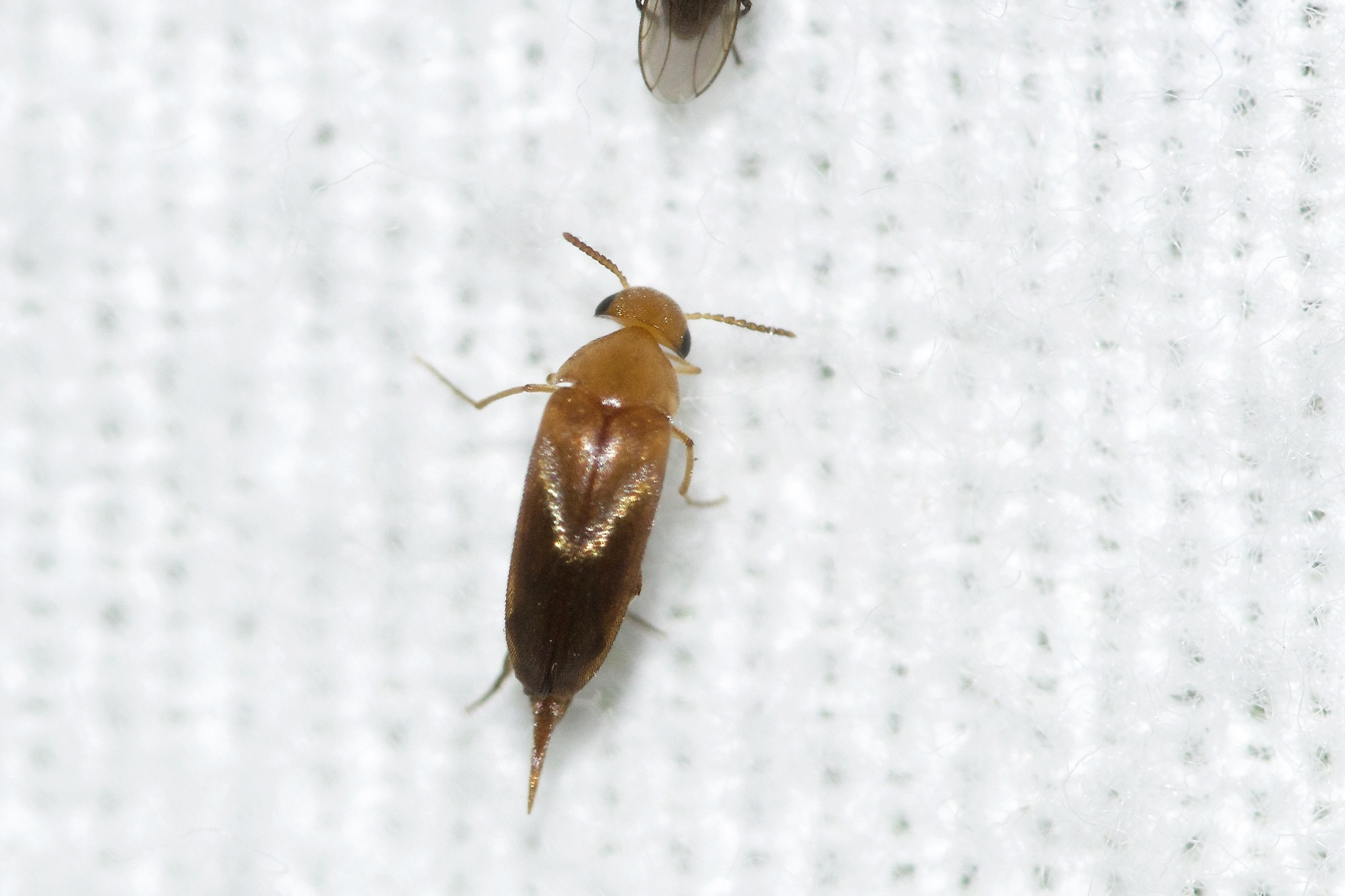
Mordellistena vapida, Canada

Mordellistena is a genus of tumbling flower beetles in the family Mordellidae. There are more than 450 described species in Mordellistena, found worldwide.

== Species ==
The following species are members of the genus Mordellistena:

- Mordellistena abaceta Lea, 1917
- Mordellistena acuticollis Schilsky, 1895
- Mordellistena aegea Franciscolo, 1949
- Mordellistena aemula LeConte, 1859
- Mordellistena aequalica Ermisch, 1977
- Mordellistena aequalis Smith, 1882
- Mordellistena aertsi Ermisch, 1963
- Mordellistena aethiops Smith, 1882
- Mordellistena algeriensis Ermisch, 1966
- Mordellistena alpicola Ermisch, 1963
- Mordellistena alternizona Lea, 1929
- Mordellistena altestriatoides Horak, 1995
- Mordellistena altifrons Stshegoleva-Barovskaya, 1927
- Mordellistena amabilis Maeklin, 1875
- Mordellistena amphicometa Maeklin, 1875
- Mordellistena amplicollis Ermisch, 1941
- Mordellistena anaspoides Franciscolo, 1967
- Mordellistena andreae LeConte, 1862
- Mordellistena angusta LeConte, 1862
- Mordellistena angustiformis Ray, 1937
- Mordellistena angustula Ermisch, 1977
- Mordellistena antiqua Ermisch, 1941
- Mordellistena apicerufa Ermisch, 1977
- Mordellistena arcuata Ray, 1946
- Mordellistena argenteola Liljeblad, 1945
- Mordellistena arizonensis Ray, 1947
- Mordellistena aspersa (Melsheimer, 1845)
- Mordellistena atriceps Smith, 1882
- Mordellistena atrogemellata Ermisch, 1965
- Mordellistena atronitens Lea, 1917
- Mordellistena attenuata (Say, 1826)
- Mordellistena aureomicans Ermisch, 1965
- Mordellistena aureotaomentosa Ermisch, 1966
- Mordellistena australasiae Csiki, 1915
- Mordellistena austriaca Schilsky, 1899
- Mordellistena austriacensis Ermisch, 1956
- Mordellistena austrina Champion, 1895
- Mordellistena badia Liljeblad, 1945
- Mordellistena balcanica Ermisch, 1967
- Mordellistena balearica Compte, 1985
- Mordellistena baliani Franciscolo, 1942
- Mordellistena batteni Horak, 1980
- Mordellistena bavarica Ermisch, 1963
- Mordellistena bevisi Franciscolo, 1956
- Mordellistena bicinctella LeConte, 1862
- Mordellistena bicoloripilosa Ermisch, 1967
- Mordellistena bicoloripyga Píc, 1937
- Mordellistena bifasciata Ray, 1936
- Mordellistena bifurcata Maeklin, 1875
- Mordellistena bihirsuta Ray, 1947
- Mordellistena bipustulata Helmuth, 1864
- Mordellistena biroi Ermisch, 1977
- Mordellistena bivittata Maeklin, 1875
- Mordellistena blandula Liljeblad, 1945
- Mordellistena bolognai Horak, 1990
- Mordellistena breddini Ermisch, 1963
- Mordellistena brevicauda (Boheman, 1849)
- Mordellistena bruneipennis McLeay, 1872
- Mordellistena brunneispinosa Ermisch, 1963
- Mordellistena bulgarica Ermisch, 1977
- Mordellistena cairnsensis Lea, 1929
- Mordellistena caledonica Fauvel, 1905
- Mordellistena caliginosa Liljeblad, 1945
- Mordellistena callens Champion, 1891
- Mordellistena canariensis Ermisch, 1965
- Mordellistena caprai Franciscolo, 1942
- Mordellistena carinthiaca Ermisch, 1966
- Mordellistena castaneicolor Champion, 1891
- Mordellistena castigata Lea, 1917
- Mordellistena cattleyana Champion, 1913
- Mordellistena caudatissima Franciscolo, 1967
- Mordellistena cervicalis LeConte, 1862
- Mordellistena coelioxys Lea, 1917
- Mordellistena cognata Maeklin, 1875
- Mordellistena columbretensis Compte, 1969
- Mordellistena comata (LeConte, 1858)
- Mordellistena comes Marseul, 1876
- Mordellistena concinna Lea, 1917
- Mordellistena concolor Lea, 1902
- Mordellistena confinis Costa, 1854
- Mordellistena conformis Smith, 1883
- Mordellistena confusa Blatchley, 1910
- Mordellistena connata Ermisch, 1969
- Mordellistena consobrina Ermisch, 1977
- Mordellistena convicta LeConte, 1862
- Mordellistena crinita Liljeblad, 1945
- Mordellistena csiki Ermisch, 1977
- Mordellistena cupreipennis Franciscolo, 1967
- Mordellistena curticornis Ermisch, 1977
- Mordellistena curvimana Kirsch, 1873
- Mordellistena cuspidata (W.J. Macleay, 1872)
- Mordellistena cypria Ermisch, 1963
- Mordellistena dalmatica Ermisch, 1956
- Mordellistena delicatula Dury, 1906
- Mordellistena dentata Batten, 1978
- Mordellistena dieckmanni Ermisch, 1963
- Mordellistena diegosa Píc, 1917
- Mordellistena dietrichi Ray, 1946
- Mordellistena difficilis Ermisch, 1963
- Mordellistena diffinis Maeklin, 1875
- Mordellistena dimidiata Helmuth, 1864
- Mordellistena distorta Champion, 1891
- Mordellistena dives Emery, 1876
- Mordellistena divisa LeConte, 1859
- Mordellistena dolini Odnosum, 2005
- Mordellistena downesi Hatch, 1965
- Mordellistena dvoraki Ermisch, 1956
- Mordellistena edashigei Chûjô, 1956
- Mordellistena elbrusicola Ermisch, 1969
- Mordellistena elegantula Smith, 1882
- Mordellistena elicodomma Franciscolo, 1967
- Mordellistena eludens Allen, 1999
- Mordellistena ephippium Ray, 1937
- Mordellistena episternalis Mulsant, 1856
- Mordellistena episternaloides Ermisch, 1963
- Mordellistena erdoesi Ermisch, 1977
- Mordellistena ermischi Compte, 1966
- Mordellistena errans Fall, 1907
- Mordellistena estcourtensis Franciscolo, 1967
- Mordellistena eversi Ermisch, 1965
- Mordellistena excisa Stchegoleva-Barovskaya, 1927
- Mordellistena exclamationis Pic, 1924
- Mordellistena exclusa Ermisch, 1977
- Mordellistena exigua (Boheman, 1858)
- Mordellistena fageli Ermisch, 1969
- Mordellistena falsoparvula Ermisch, 1956
- Mordellistena falsoparvuliformis Ermisch, 1963
- Mordellistena feigei Ermisch, 1956
- Mordellistena fenderi Ray, 1947
- Mordellistena ferruginipes Ermisch, 1966
- Mordellistena ferruginoides Smith, 1882
- Mordellistena festiva Ermisch, 1977
- Mordellistena flavella Ermisch, 1963
- Mordellistena flaviceps Motschulsky, 1863
- Mordellistena flavofrontalis Franciscolo, 1956
- Mordellistena flavospinosa Hubenthal, 1911
- Mordellistena flavospinulosa Ermisch, 1977
- Mordellistena florissantensis Wickham, 1912
- Mordellistena frosti Liljeblad, 1918
- Mordellistena fulvicollis (Melsheimer, 1845)
- Mordellistena fulvipennis Scegoleva-Barovskaja, 1932
- Mordellistena fusca (Lea, 1895)
- Mordellistena fuscata (Melsheimer, 1846)
- Mordellistena fuscipennis (Melsheimer, 1845)
- Mordellistena fuscoatra Helmuth, 1864
- Mordellistena fuscogemellata Ermisch, 1963
- Mordellistena fuscogemellatoides Ermisch, 1977
- Mordellistena fuscula Lea, 1917
- Mordellistena galapagoensis Van Dyke, 1953
- Mordellistena gallica Ermisch, 1956
- Mordellistena gemellata Schilsky, 1899
- Mordellistena geronensis Ermisch, 1977
- Mordellistena gfelleri Horák, 1990
- Mordellistena gibbosa Franciscolo, 1967
- Mordellistena gibbula Maeklin, 1875
- Mordellistena gigantea Khalaf, 1971
- Mordellistena gigas Liljeblad, 1917
- Mordellistena goeckei Ermisch, 1941
- Mordellistena goetzi Ermisch, 1969
- Mordellistena gounellei Pic, 1941
- Mordellistena grammica LeConte, 1862
- Mordellistena grandii Franciscolo, 1942
- Mordellistena grisea Mulsant, 1856
- Mordellistena helvetica Ermisch, 1967
- Mordellistena heterocolor Ray, 1946
- Mordellistena hirticula Smith, 1883
- Mordellistena hirtipes Schilsky, 1895
- Mordellistena hoberlandti Horak, 1983
- Mordellistena hollandica Ermisch, 1966
- Mordellistena hoosieri Blatchley, 1910
- Mordellistena horaki Pino, 1985
- Mordellistena horioni Ermisch, 1956
- Mordellistena horvathi Ermisch, 1977
- Mordellistena huachucaensis Ray, 1946
- Mordellistena humeralis (Linnaeus, 1758)
- Mordellistena humeronotata Champion, 1922
- Mordellistena humeropicta Ermisch, 1963
- Mordellistena humerosa Ray, 1946
- Mordellistena hungarica Ermisch, 1977
- Mordellistena husseyi Liljeblad, 1945
- Mordellistena idahoensis Ray, 1946
- Mordellistena imbecilla Maeklin, 1875
- Mordellistena imitatrix Allen, 1995
- Mordellistena inaequalis Mulsant, 1856
- Mordellistena incommunis Liljeblad, 1921
- Mordellistena indistincta Smith, 1882
- Mordellistena inexpectata Ermisch, 1967
- Mordellistena inornata Smith, 1882
- Mordellistena insignata Ermisch, 1965
- Mordellistena instabilis Champion, 1891
- Mordellistena insularis (Boheman, 1858)
- Mordellistena intermixta Helmuth, 1865
- Mordellistena intersecta Emery, 1876
- Mordellistena irfianorum Lu & Ivie, 1999
- Mordellistena irritans Franciscolo, 1991
- Mordellistena isabellina Champion, 1891
- Mordellistena istrica Ermisch, 1977
- Mordellistena kirghizica Odnosum, 2003
- Mordellistena klapperichi Ermisch, 1956
- Mordellistena kochi Ermisch, 1956
- Mordellistena koelleri Ermisch, 1956
- Mordellistena korschefskyana Ermisch, 1963
- Mordellistena kraatzi Emery, 1876
- Mordellistena krauseri Plaza, 1986
- Mordellistena krujanensis Ermisch, 1963
- Mordellistena laterimarginalis Ermisch, 1956
- Mordellistena latitarsis Batten, 1983
- Mordellistena lawrencei Franciscolo, 1967
- Mordellistena leai Ray, 1937
- Mordellistena leonardi Ray, 1946
- Mordellistena leporina LeConte, 1862
- Mordellistena lesbia Ermisch, 1965
- Mordellistena lichtneckerti Ermisch, 1977
- Mordellistena liljebladi Ermisch, 1965
- Mordellistena lilliputiana Mulsant, 1856
- Mordellistena limbalis (Melsheimer, 1845)
- Mordellistena lindbergi Ermisch, 1963
- Mordellistena lineata Ray, 1937
- Mordellistena liturata (Melsheimer, 1845)
- Mordellistena lodingi Liljeblad, 1945
- Mordellistena lonai Franciscolo, 1949
- Mordellistena longelytrata Franciscolo, 1967
- Mordellistena longicornis Mulsant, 1856
- Mordellistena longicornoides Ermisch, 1965
- Mordellistena longictena Khalaf, 1971
- Mordellistena longipalpis Emery, 1891
- Mordellistena longipes (Lea, 1895)
- Mordellistena louisianae Khalaf, 1971
- Mordellistena lucidovirga Ray, 1937
- Mordellistena lusitanica Ermisch, 1963
- Mordellistena lutea (Melsheimer, 1845)
- Mordellistena luteipalpis Schilsky, 1895
- Mordellistena luteispina Ermisch, 1977
- Mordellistena luteofasciata Ermisch, 1962
- Mordellistena luteolineata Pic, 1929
- Mordellistena luteonotata Pic, 1929
- Mordellistena luteovittata Ermisch, 1962
- Mordellistena magyarica Ermisch, 1977
- Mordellistena majuscula Ermisch, 1977
- Mordellistena malkini Ray, 1947
- Mordellistena manteroi Franciscolo, 1942
- Mordellistena marginalis (Say, 1824)
- Mordellistena marginicollis Maeklin, 1875
- Mordellistena marginiloba Franciscolo, 1967
- Mordellistena maroccana Ermisch, 1966
- Mordellistena masoni Liljeblad, 1918
- Mordellistena mazedonica Ermisch, 1965
- Mordellistena mediana Ermisch, 1977
- Mordellistena mediogemellata Ermisch, 1977
- Mordellistena megacera Lea, 1929
- Mordellistena megalops Lea, 1929
- Mordellistena melvillensis Lea, 1917
- Mordellistena meuseli Ermisch, 1956
- Mordellistena micans (Germar, 1817)
- Mordellistena michalki Ermisch, 1956
- Mordellistena microgemellata Ermisch, 1965
- Mordellistena microscopica Ermisch, 1977
- Mordellistena mihoki Ermisch, 1977
- Mordellistena militaris LeConte, 1862
- Mordellistena minima Costa, 1854
- Mordellistena minuta Smith, 1882
- Mordellistena minutula Ermisch, 1956
- Mordellistena misella Maeklin, 1875
- Mordellistena mississippiensis Khalaf, 1971
- Mordellistena mixta Ray, 1946
- Mordellistena miyamotoi Nakane, 1956
- Mordellistena montrouzieri Csiki, 1915
- Mordellistena morula LeConte, 1862
- Mordellistena mrazi Pic, 1924
- Mordellistena mullahyi Khalaf, 1971
- Mordellistena multicicatrix Kangas, 1986
- Mordellistena multicolor Franciscolo, 1967
- Mordellistena multicolorata Batten, 1990
- Mordellistena multistrigosa Ermisch, 1967
- Mordellistena nana Motschulsky, 1860
- Mordellistena nanula Ermisch, 1967
- Mordellistena nanuloides Ermisch, 1967
- Mordellistena nebulosa Liljeblad, 1945
- Mordellistena neglecta Ermisch, 1977
- Mordellistena neocincta Ray, 1946
- Mordellistena neofascia Ray, 1946
- Mordellistena nessebaricus Batten, 1980
- Mordellistena neuwaldeggiana (Panzer, 1796)
- Mordellistena nigella Liljeblad, 1945
- Mordellistena nigrimacula Franciscolo, 1967
- Mordellistena nigritarsis Horak, 1996
- Mordellistena nigrocapillata Ermisch, 1965
- Mordellistena nigrosignata Maeklin, 1875
- Mordellistena nitidicoma Lea, 1929
- Mordellistena notabilis Maeklin, 1875
- Mordellistena nubila (LeConte, 1858)
- Mordellistena nunenmacheri Liljeblad, 1918
- Mordellistena obliquestrigosa Franciscolo, 1967
- Mordellistena ocularis Franciscolo, 1967
- Mordellistena olympica Ermisch, 1965
- Mordellistena oranensis Pic, 1900
- Mordellistena ornata (Melsheimer, 1845)
- Mordellistena ozarkensis Ray, 1936
- Mordellistena pallens Fall, 1907
- Mordellistena pallidoptera Khalaf, 1971
- Mordellistena pallipes Smith, 1882
- Mordellistena palmi Liljeblad, 1945
- Mordellistena parabrevicauda Ermisch, 1965
- Mordellistena paradisa Liljeblad, 1945
- Mordellistena paradohumeralis Ermisch, 1963
- Mordellistena paraepisternalis Ermisch, 1965
- Mordellistena paraintersecta Ermisch, 1965
- Mordellistena paranana Ermisch, 1977
- Mordellistena parapentas Ermisch, 1977
- Mordellistena pararhenana Ermisch, 1977
- Mordellistena paraweisei Ermisch, 1977
- Mordellistena parumstrigosa Franciscolo, 1967
- Mordellistena parvicauda Ermisch, 1967
- Mordellistena parvula (Gyllenhal, 1827)
- Mordellistena parvuliformis Stchegoleva-Barovskaya, 1930
- Mordellistena paucistrigosa Ermisch, 1965
- Mordellistena pauxilla Liljeblad, 1945
- Mordellistena peloponnesensis Batten, 1980
- Mordellistena pentas Mulsant, 1856
- Mordellistena perantennata Franciscolo, 1967
- Mordellistena permira Franciscolo, 1949
- Mordellistena perparvula Ermisch, 1966
- Mordellistena perroudi Mulsant, 1856
- Mordellistena persica Horak, 1983
- Mordellistena picilabris Helmuth, 1864
- Mordellistena picipennis Smith, 1882
- Mordellistena picipes Costa, 1854
- Mordellistena pilosula Maeklin, 1875
- Mordellistena platypoda Selnekovic, Goffova & Kodada, 2023
- Mordellistena podlussanyi Csetó, 1990
- Mordellistena pontica Ermisch, 1977
- Mordellistena porphyria Nomura, 1951
- Mordellistena praesagita Kangas, 1988
- Mordellistena praetoriana Franciscolo, 1967
- Mordellistena pratensis Smith, 1883
- Mordellistena prescutellaris Pic, 1929
- Mordellistena problematica Franciscolo, 1952
- Mordellistena pseudobrevicauda Ermisch, 1963
- Mordellistena pseudohirtipes Ermisch, 1965
- Mordellistena pseudolatipalposa Franciscolo, 1967
- Mordellistena pseudomicans Ermisch, 1977
- Mordellistena pseudonana Ermisch, 1956
- Mordellistena pseudoparvula Ermisch, 1956
- Mordellistena pseudopumila Ermisch, 1963
- Mordellistena pseudoreichei Ermisch, 1977
- Mordellistena pseudorhenana Ermisch, 1977
- Mordellistena pseudorugipennis Ermisch, 1963
- Mordellistena puberula Maeklin, 1875
- Mordellistena pulcherrima Lea, 1917
- Mordellistena pulchra Liljeblad, 1917
- Mordellistena pullata Liljeblad, 1945
- Mordellistena pumila (Gyllenhal, 1810)
- Mordellistena purpurascens Costa, 1854
- Mordellistena purpureonigrans Ermisch, 1963
- Mordellistena purpureotincta Lea, 1929
- Mordellistena pustulata (Melsheimer, 1846)
- Mordellistena pygmaeola Ermisch, 1956
- Mordellistena pyrenaea Ermisch, 1966
- Mordellistena quadrinotata Liljeblad, 1921
- Mordellistena quadrinotatipennis Píc, 1928
- Mordellistena rayi Ermisch, 1965
- Mordellistena reichei Emery, 1876
- Mordellistena reitteri Schilsky, 1894
- Mordellistena rhenana Ermisch, 1956
- Mordellistena rhizophorae Lea, 1925
- Mordellistena rubrifascia Liljeblad, 1945
- Mordellistena rubrilabris Helmuth, 1864
- Mordellistena rubrofrontalis Ray, 1936
- Mordellistena rufescens Smith, 1882
- Mordellistena rufifrons Schilsky, 1894
- Mordellistena rufilabris Helmuth, 1864
- Mordellistena rufiventris Helmuth, 1864
- Mordellistena rufocephala Ray, 1936
- Mordellistena rufospina Ermisch, 1977
- Mordellistena rufotestacea Motschulsky, 1863
- Mordellistena rugipennis Schilsky, 1895
- Mordellistena rusticula Maeklin, 1875
- Mordellistena salisburiana Péringuey, 1904
- Mordellistena santiagona Píc, 1929
- Mordellistena saxonica Ermisch, 1967
- Mordellistena scalaris Helmuth, 1864
- Mordellistena schatzmayri Franciscolo, 1949
- Mordellistena schauppi Smith, 1882
- Mordellistena schoutedeni schoutedeni Píc, 1931
- Mordellistena secreta Horák, 1983
- Mordellistena semiferruginea Reitter, 1911
- Mordellistena semirufa Maeklin, 1875
- Mordellistena sericans Fall, 1907
- Mordellistena sericata Wollaston, 1864
- Mordellistena serraticornis Horak, 1991
- Mordellistena sexnotata Dury, 1902
- Mordellistena signaticollis Quedenfeldt, 1885
- Mordellistena simillima Franciscolo, 1959
- Mordellistena simplex Maeklin, 1875
- Mordellistena smithi Dury, 1902
- Mordellistena solarii Franciscolo, 1942
- Mordellistena soror Ermisch, 1941
- Mordellistena sparsa Champion, 1891
- Mordellistena splendens Smith, 1882
- Mordellistena stenidea Mulsant, 1856
- Mordellistena stephani Downie, 1987
- Mordellistena stoeckleini Ermisch, 1956
- Mordellistena subepisternalis Ermisch, 1965
- Mordellistena subfucus Liljeblad, 1945
- Mordellistena subfuscus Liljeblad, 1945
- Mordellistena subpellucida Lea, 1929
- Mordellistena subsquamosa Schilsky, 1899
- Mordellistena subtruncata Mulsant, 1856
- Mordellistena suspecta Fall, 1907
- Mordellistena suturalis Ray, 1947
- Mordellistena suturella Helmuth, 1864
- Mordellistena swierstrai Franciscolo, 1967
- Mordellistena syntaenia Liljeblad, 1921
- Mordellistena tantula Liljeblad, 1945
- Mordellistena taorminensis Ermisch, 1965
- Mordellistena tarsalis Smith, 1883
- Mordellistena tarsata Mulsant, 1856
- Mordellistena teneriffensis Ermisch, 1965
- Mordellistena tenuicornis Schilsky, 1898
- Mordellistena terminata Ray, 1946
- Mordellistena testaceithorax Franciscolo, 1967
- Mordellistena tetraspilota Burne, 1989
- Mordellistena texana Smith, 1882
- Mordellistena thoracalis Franciscolo, 1967
- Mordellistena thurepalmi Ermisch, 1965
- Mordellistena thuringiaca Ermisch, 1963
- Mordellistena tibialis Lea, 1917
- Mordellistena tondui Horák, 1996
- Mordellistena torresensis Lea, 1929
- Mordellistena tosta LeConte, 1862
- Mordellistena transtroemeriana
- Mordellistena trichura Lea, 1917
- Mordellistena trifasciata (Say, 1826)
- Mordellistena trilineata Mulsant, 1856
- Mordellistena trimaculata Motschulsky, 1863
- Mordellistena turkmenica Odnosum, 2003
- Mordellistena umbra Franciscolo, 1949
- Mordellistena unicolor LeConte, 1862
- Mordellistena uniformis Ray, 1946
- Mordellistena vapida LeConte, 1862
- Mordellistena variegata (Fabricius, 1798)
- Mordellistena varietas Ray, 1937
- Mordellistena vera Liljeblad, 1917
- Mordellistena vilis (LeConte, 1858)
- Mordellistena villiersi Franciscolo, 1955
- Mordellistena virginica Steury & Steiner, 2020
- Mordellistena viridescens Liljeblad, 1945
- Mordellistena vogti Ermisch, 1963
- Mordellistena wankai Ermisch, 1966
- Mordellistena weisei Schilsky, 1895
- Mordellistena wenzeli Liljeblad, 1945
- Mordellistena wiebesi Batten, 1977
- Mordellistena ynotata Ray, 1947
- Mordellistena yumae Ray, 1946
- Mordellistena zoltani Ermisch, 1977
- Mordellistena zululandiae Franciscolo, 1956

Possibly also includes

- Mordellistena menoko Kôno, 1932 possibly revised as Pseudotolida menoko (Kôno, 1932)
- Pseudomordellina hattorii
