= Mordellistena ermischi =

Scientific classification
- Domain: Eukaryota
- Kingdom: Animalia
- Phylum: Arthropoda
- Class: Insecta
- Order: Coleoptera
- Suborder: Polyphaga
- Infraorder: Cucujiformia
- Family: Mordellidae
- Genus: Mordellistena
- Species: M. ermischi

Binomial name
- Mordellistena ermischi Compte, 1966

Species of beetle

Mordellistena ermischi is a species of beetle in the genus Mordellistena of the family Mordellidae. It was described in 1966 by Compte and is found on Balearic Islands.
