= Mordellistena parvicauda =

Scientific classification
- Domain: Eukaryota
- Kingdom: Animalia
- Phylum: Arthropoda
- Class: Insecta
- Order: Coleoptera
- Suborder: Polyphaga
- Infraorder: Cucujiformia
- Family: Mordellidae
- Genus: Mordellistena
- Species: M. parvicauda

Binomial name
- Mordellistena parvicauda Ermisch, 1967

Species of beetle

Mordellistena parvicauda is a species of beetle in the genus Mordellistena of the family Mordellidae. It was described by Ermisch in 1967 and can be found in countries like Albania, Bosnia and Herzegovina, Bulgaria, Croatia, Greece and North Macedonia.
