= Mordellistena pilosula =

Scientific classification
- Kingdom: Animalia
- Phylum: Arthropoda
- Class: Insecta
- Order: Coleoptera
- Suborder: Polyphaga
- Infraorder: Cucujiformia
- Family: Mordellidae
- Genus: Mordellistena
- Species: M. pilosula

Binomial name
- Mordellistena pilosula Maeklin, 1875

Species of beetle

Mordellistena pilosula is a species of beetle in the genus Mordellistena of the family Mordellidae. It was described by Maeklin in 1875.
