= Mordellistena gounellei =

Scientific classification
- Kingdom: Animalia
- Phylum: Arthropoda
- Class: Insecta
- Order: Coleoptera
- Suborder: Polyphaga
- Infraorder: Cucujiformia
- Family: Mordellidae
- Genus: Mordellistena
- Species: M. gounellei

Binomial name
- Mordellistena gounellei Píc, 1941

Species of beetle

Mordellistena gounellei is a beetle in the genus Mordellistena of the family Mordellidae. It was described in 1941 by Maurice Pic.
