= Mordellistena perparvula =

Scientific classification
- Domain: Eukaryota
- Kingdom: Animalia
- Phylum: Arthropoda
- Class: Insecta
- Order: Coleoptera
- Suborder: Polyphaga
- Infraorder: Cucujiformia
- Family: Mordellidae
- Genus: Mordellistena
- Species: M. perparvula

Binomial name
- Mordellistena perparvula Ermisch, 1966

Species of beetle

Mordellistena perparvula is a species of beetle in the genus Mordellistena of the family Mordellidae. It was described by Ermisch in 1966 and is endemic to Hungary.
