= Mordellistena hoosieri =

Scientific classification
- Domain: Eukaryota
- Kingdom: Animalia
- Phylum: Arthropoda
- Class: Insecta
- Order: Coleoptera
- Suborder: Polyphaga
- Infraorder: Cucujiformia
- Family: Mordellidae
- Genus: Mordellistena
- Species: M. hoosieri

Binomial name
- Mordellistena hoosieri Blatchley, 1910

Species of beetle

Mordellistena hoosieri is a species of beetle in the genus Mordellistena, family Mordellidae. It was described in 1910 by Blatchley.
