= Mordellistena fageli =

Scientific classification
- Domain: Eukaryota
- Kingdom: Animalia
- Phylum: Arthropoda
- Class: Insecta
- Order: Coleoptera
- Suborder: Polyphaga
- Infraorder: Cucujiformia
- Family: Mordellidae
- Genus: Mordellistena
- Species: M. fageli

Binomial name
- Mordellistena fageli Ermisch, 1970

Species of beetle

Mordellistena fageli is a beetle in the genus Mordellistena of the family Mordellidae. It was described in 1970 by Ermisch.
