= Raymordella (subgenus) =

Scientific classification
- Kingdom: Animalia
- Phylum: Arthropoda
- Class: Insecta
- Order: Coleoptera
- Family: Mordellidae
- Genus: Raymordella
- Subgenus: Raymordella Franciscolo, 1956

Genus of beetles

Raymordella is a genus of beetles in the family Mordellidae, containing the following species:

- Raymordella adusta Franciscolo, 1967
- Raymordella ambigua Franciscolo, 1956
- Raymordella transversalis Franciscolo, 1967
