= Falsomordellistena partilis =

Scientific classification
- Domain: Eukaryota
- Kingdom: Animalia
- Phylum: Arthropoda
- Class: Insecta
- Order: Coleoptera
- Suborder: Polyphaga
- Infraorder: Cucujiformia
- Family: Mordellidae
- Subfamily: Mordellinae
- Tribe: Mordellistenini
- Genus: Falsomordellistena
- Species: F. partilis

Binomial name
- Falsomordellistena partilis (Champion, 1917)

Synonyms
- Mordellistena partilis (Champion, 1917)

Species of beetle

Falsomordellistena partilis is a species of Tumbling Flower Beetles in the family Mordellidae, found in the Seychelles.
