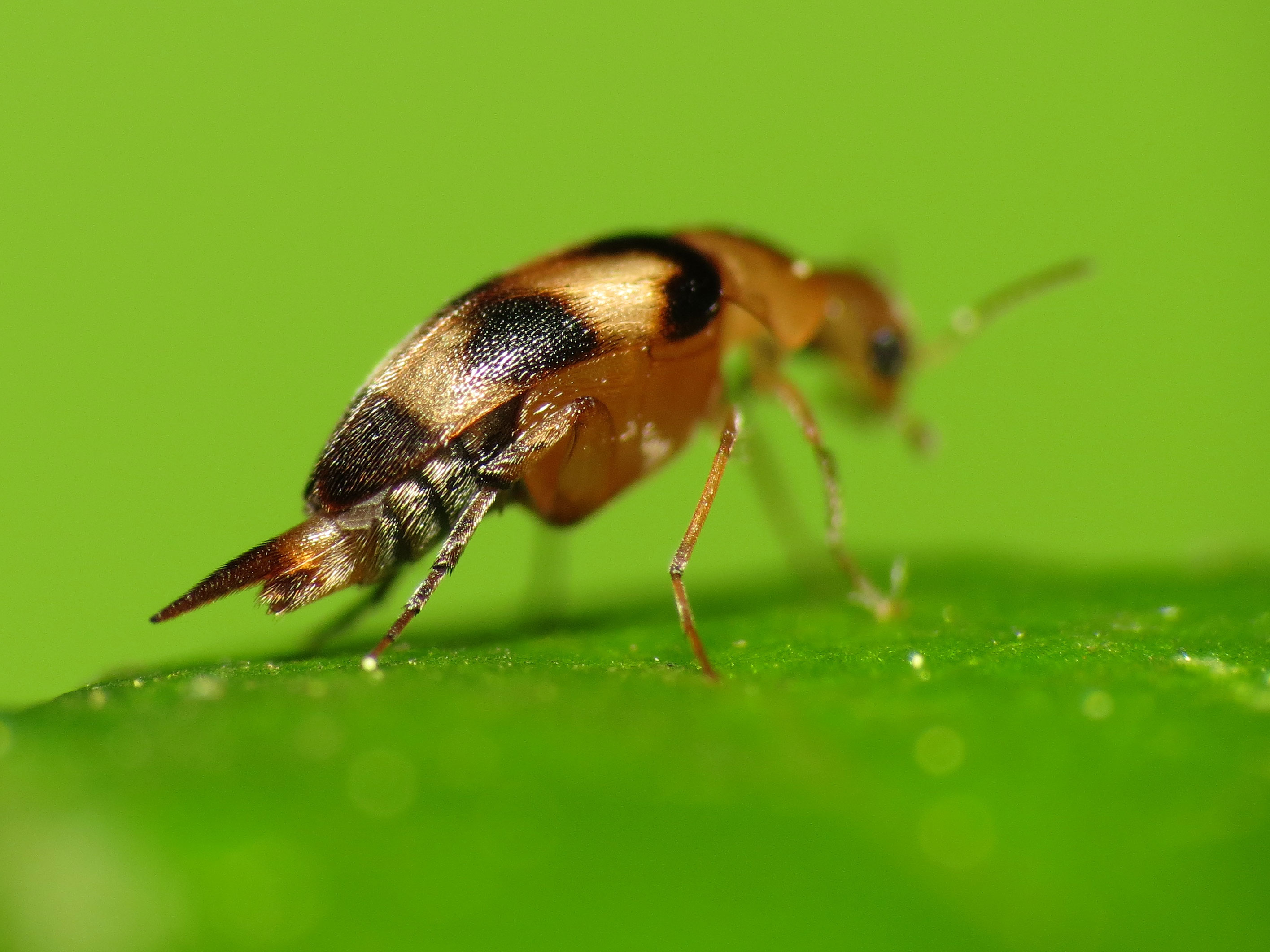
- Mordellistena trifasciata, Washington, DC

Scientific classification
- Domain: Eukaryota
- Kingdom: Animalia
- Phylum: Arthropoda
- Class: Insecta
- Order: Coleoptera
- Suborder: Polyphaga
- Infraorder: Cucujiformia
- Family: Mordellidae
- Subfamily: Mordellinae
- Tribe: Mordellistenini
- Genus: Mordellistena
- Species: M. trifasciata

Binomial name
- Mordellistena trifasciata (Say, 1826)

Synonyms
- Mordellistena lepidula LeConte 1862; Mordellistena amica LeConte 1862

= Mordellistena trifasciata =

Species of beetles

Mordellistena trifasciata is a species of tumbling flower beetle in the family Mordellidae. It is found in North America.
