= Mordellistena simplex =

Scientific classification
- Kingdom: Animalia
- Phylum: Arthropoda
- Class: Insecta
- Order: Coleoptera
- Suborder: Polyphaga
- Infraorder: Cucujiformia
- Family: Mordellidae
- Subfamily: Mordellinae
- Tribe: Mordellistenini
- Genus: Mordellistena
- Species: M. simplex

Binomial name
- Mordellistena simplex Maeklin, 1875

Species of beetle

Mordellistena simplex is a species of beetle in the genus Mordellistena of the family Mordellidae. It was described by Maeklin in 1875.
