= Neomordellina =

Scientific classification
- Kingdom: Animalia
- Phylum: Arthropoda
- Class: Insecta
- Order: Coleoptera
- Family: Mordellidae
- Genus: Neomordellistena
- Subgenus: Neomordellina Franciscolo, 1967

Subgenus of beetles

Neomordellina is a subgenus of the genus Neomordellistena of beetles in the family Mordellidae, containing the following species:

- Neomordellistena crassipennis Franciscolo, 1967
- Neomordellistena houtiensis Franciscolo, 1967
- Neomordellistena testaceispina Franciscolo, 1967
