= Falsomordellistena danforthi =

Scientific classification
- Domain: Eukaryota
- Kingdom: Animalia
- Phylum: Arthropoda
- Class: Insecta
- Order: Coleoptera
- Suborder: Polyphaga
- Infraorder: Cucujiformia
- Family: Mordellidae
- Genus: Falsomordellistena
- Species: F. danforthi

Binomial name
- Falsomordellistena danforthi (Ray, 1937)

Synonyms
- Mordellistena danforthi Ray, 1937

Species of beetle

Falsomordellistena danforthi is a species of beetle in the family Mordellidae. It was described in 1937 by Eugene Ray from Puerto Rico.

This beetle measures 2.3–2.4 mm (0.091–0.094 in) in length, or 3.2–3.5 mm (0.13–0.14 in) when including the anal stylus. The antennae are 1 mm (0.039 in) long.
