= Iberomorda sulcicauda =

Scientific classification
- Domain: Eukaryota
- Kingdom: Animalia
- Phylum: Arthropoda
- Class: Insecta
- Order: Coleoptera
- Suborder: Polyphaga
- Infraorder: Cucujiformia
- Family: Mordellidae
- Subfamily: Mordellinae
- Tribe: Mordellini
- Genus: Iberomorda
- Species: I. sulcicauda

Binomial name
- Iberomorda sulcicauda (Mulsant, 1856)

Synonyms
- Mordella sulcicauda Mulsant, 1856

Species of beetles

Iberomorda sulcicauda is a species of tumbling flower beetle in the family Mordellidae.
