= Neomordellistena (subgenus) =

Scientific classification
- Kingdom: Animalia
- Phylum: Arthropoda
- Class: Insecta
- Order: Coleoptera
- Family: Mordellidae
- Genus: Neomordellistena
- Subgenus: Neomordellistena Ermisch, 1950

Type species
- Neomordellistena suturalis Ermisch, 1950

Subgenus of beetles

Neomordellistena is a subgenus of the beetle genus Neomordellistena in the family Mordellidae, containing the following species:

- Neomordellistena albopygidialis Ermisch, 1950
- Neomordellistena anticegilvifrons Ermisch, 1967
- Neomordellistena atropilosa Ermisch, 1967
- Neomordellistena bredoi Ermisch, 1952
- Neomordellistena burgeoni (Píc, 1931)
- Neomordellistena curtipennis Ermisch, 1950
- Neomordellistena distinctipennis Ermisch, 1950
- Neomordellistena flavicornis Ermisch, 1950
- Neomordellistena flavopila Ermisch, 1967
- Neomordellistena ivoirensis Ermisch, 1968
- Neomordellistena lestradei Ermisch, 1952
- Neomordellistena maculipennis Ermisch, 1950
- Neomordellistena notatipennis Ermisch, 1950
- Neomordellistena palpalis Ermisch, 1955
- Neomordellistena parvula Ermisch, 1952
- Neomordellistena picicolor Ermisch, 1952
- Neomordellistena roeri Horak, 1995
- Neomordellistena ruficeps Ermisch, 1952
- Neomordellistena rufopygidialis (Píc, 1950)
- Neomordellistena suturalis Ermisch, 1950
- Neomordellistena testacea Ermisch, 1950
- Neomordellistena tristrigosa Ermisch, 1950
- Neomordellistena variabilis (Píc, 1931)
