= Falsomordellina nigripennis =

Scientific classification
- Kingdom: Animalia
- Phylum: Arthropoda
- Class: Insecta
- Order: Coleoptera
- Suborder: Polyphaga
- Infraorder: Cucujiformia
- Family: Mordellidae
- Genus: Falsomordellina
- Species: F. nigripennis

Binomial name
- Falsomordellina nigripennis Nomura, 1967

Species of beetle

Falsomordellina nigripennis is a species of beetle in the genus Falsomordellina. It was described in 1967.
