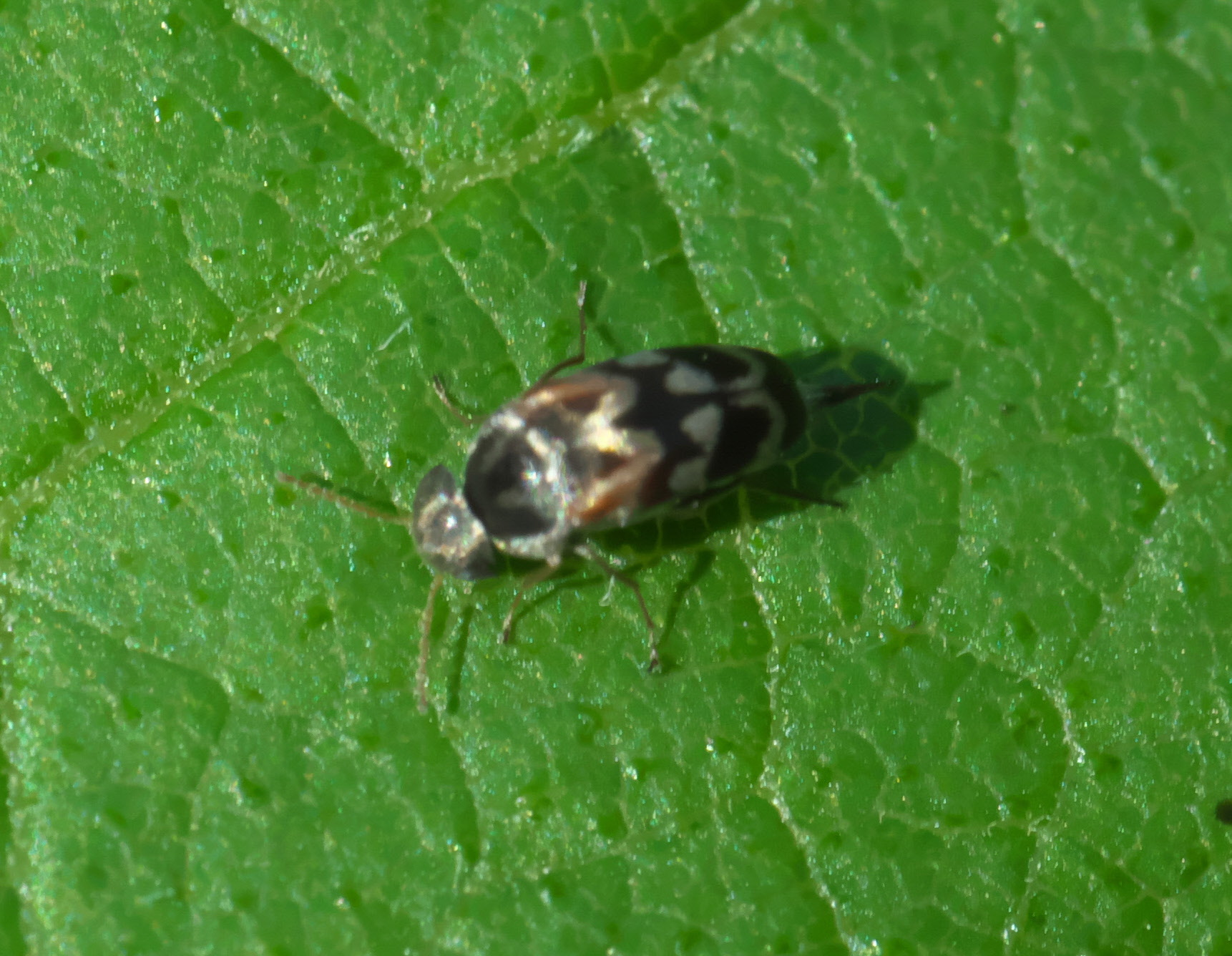
- Paramordellaria carinata

Scientific classification
- Domain: Eukaryota
- Kingdom: Animalia
- Phylum: Arthropoda
- Class: Insecta
- Order: Coleoptera
- Suborder: Polyphaga
- Infraorder: Cucujiformia
- Family: Mordellidae
- Subfamily: Mordellinae
- Tribe: Mordellini
- Genus: Paramordellaria
- Species: P. carinata

Binomial name
- Paramordellaria carinata (Smith, 1883)

Synonyms
- Tomoxia carinata (Smith, 1883); Mordella carinata Smith, 1883

= Paramordellaria carinata =

Species of beetles

Paramordellaria carinata is a species of tumbling flower beetle in the family Mordellidae, found in North America.
