= Tolidopalpus kalimantanensis =

Scientific classification
- Kingdom: Animalia
- Phylum: Arthropoda
- Class: Insecta
- Order: Coleoptera
- Suborder: Polyphaga
- Infraorder: Cucujiformia
- Family: Mordellidae
- Genus: Tolidopalpus
- Species: T. kalimantanensis

Binomial name
- Tolidopalpus kalimantanensis Shiyake, 1995

Species of beetle

Tolidopalpus kalimantanensis is a beetle in the genus Tolidopalpus of the family Mordellidae. It was described in 1995 by Shiyake.
