= Adelptes clavipalpis =

Scientific classification
- Domain: Eukaryota
- Kingdom: Animalia
- Phylum: Arthropoda
- Class: Insecta
- Order: Coleoptera
- Suborder: Polyphaga
- Infraorder: Cucujiformia
- Family: Mordellidae
- Genus: Adelptes
- Species: A. clavipalpis

Binomial name
- Adelptes clavipalpis Franciscolo, 1965

Species of beetle

Adelptes clavipalpis is a species of beetle in the genus Adelptes. It was described in 1965.
