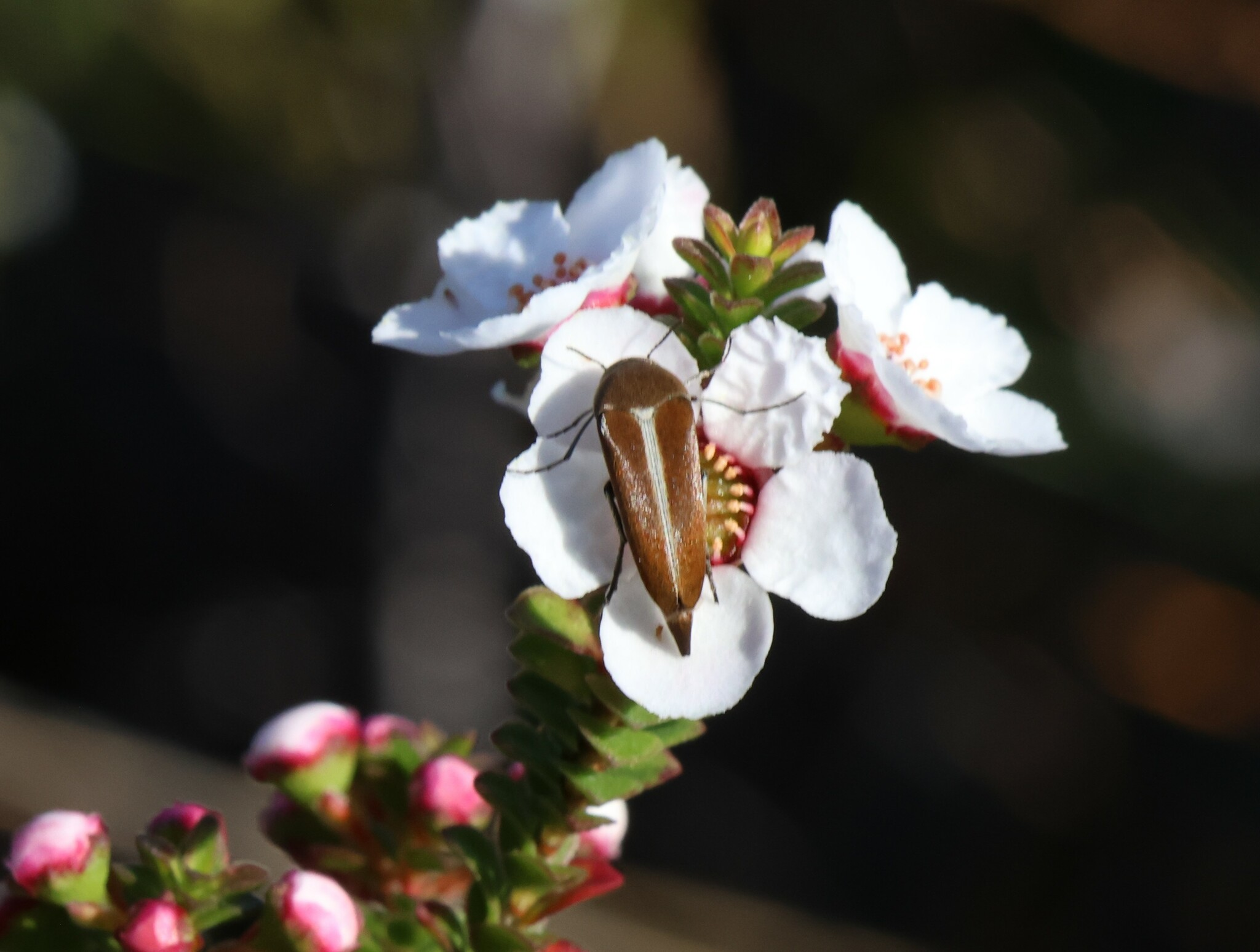
- Austromordella niveosuturalis, Australia

Scientific classification
- Domain: Eukaryota
- Kingdom: Animalia
- Phylum: Arthropoda
- Class: Insecta
- Order: Coleoptera
- Suborder: Polyphaga
- Infraorder: Cucujiformia
- Family: Mordellidae
- Subfamily: Mordellinae
- Tribe: Mordellini
- Genus: Austromordella
- Species: A. niveosuturalis

Binomial name
- Austromordella niveosuturalis (Lea, 1917)

= Austromordella niveosuturalis =

Species of beetle

Austromordella niveosuturalis is a species of tumbling flower beetles in the family Mordellidae. It is found in Australia.
