= Paratomoxioda testaceiventris =

Scientific classification
- Kingdom: Animalia
- Phylum: Arthropoda
- Class: Insecta
- Order: Coleoptera
- Suborder: Polyphaga
- Infraorder: Cucujiformia
- Family: Mordellidae
- Genus: Paratomoxioda
- Species: P. testaceiventris

Binomial name
- Paratomoxioda testaceiventris

Species of beetle

Paratomoxioda testaceiventris is a species of beetle in the genus Paratomoxioda of the family Mordellidae.
