= Mordellistena signaticollis =

Scientific classification
- Kingdom: Animalia
- Phylum: Arthropoda
- Class: Insecta
- Order: Coleoptera
- Suborder: Polyphaga
- Infraorder: Cucujiformia
- Family: Mordellidae
- Subfamily: Mordellinae
- Tribe: Mordellistenini
- Genus: Mordellistena
- Species: M. signaticollis

Binomial name
- Mordellistena signaticollis Quedenfeldt, 1885

Species of beetle

Mordellistena signaticollis is a species of beetle in the genus Mordellistena of the family Mordellidae. It was described by Quedenfeldt in 1885.
