= Falsomordellistena discolor =

Scientific classification
- Domain: Eukaryota
- Kingdom: Animalia
- Phylum: Arthropoda
- Class: Insecta
- Order: Coleoptera
- Suborder: Polyphaga
- Infraorder: Cucujiformia
- Family: Mordellidae
- Tribe: Mordellistenini
- Genus: Falsomordellistena
- Species: F. discolor

Binomial name
- Falsomordellistena discolor (Melsheimer, 1845)

Synonyms
- Mordella discolor Melsheimer, 1846; Mordellistena discolor (Melsheimer, 1845); Mordellistena cinereofasciata Smith, 1882; Mordellistena wolcotti Liljeblad, 1917

Species of beetle

Falsomordellistena discolor is a species of tumbling flower beetle in the family Mordellidae. It is found in North America.
