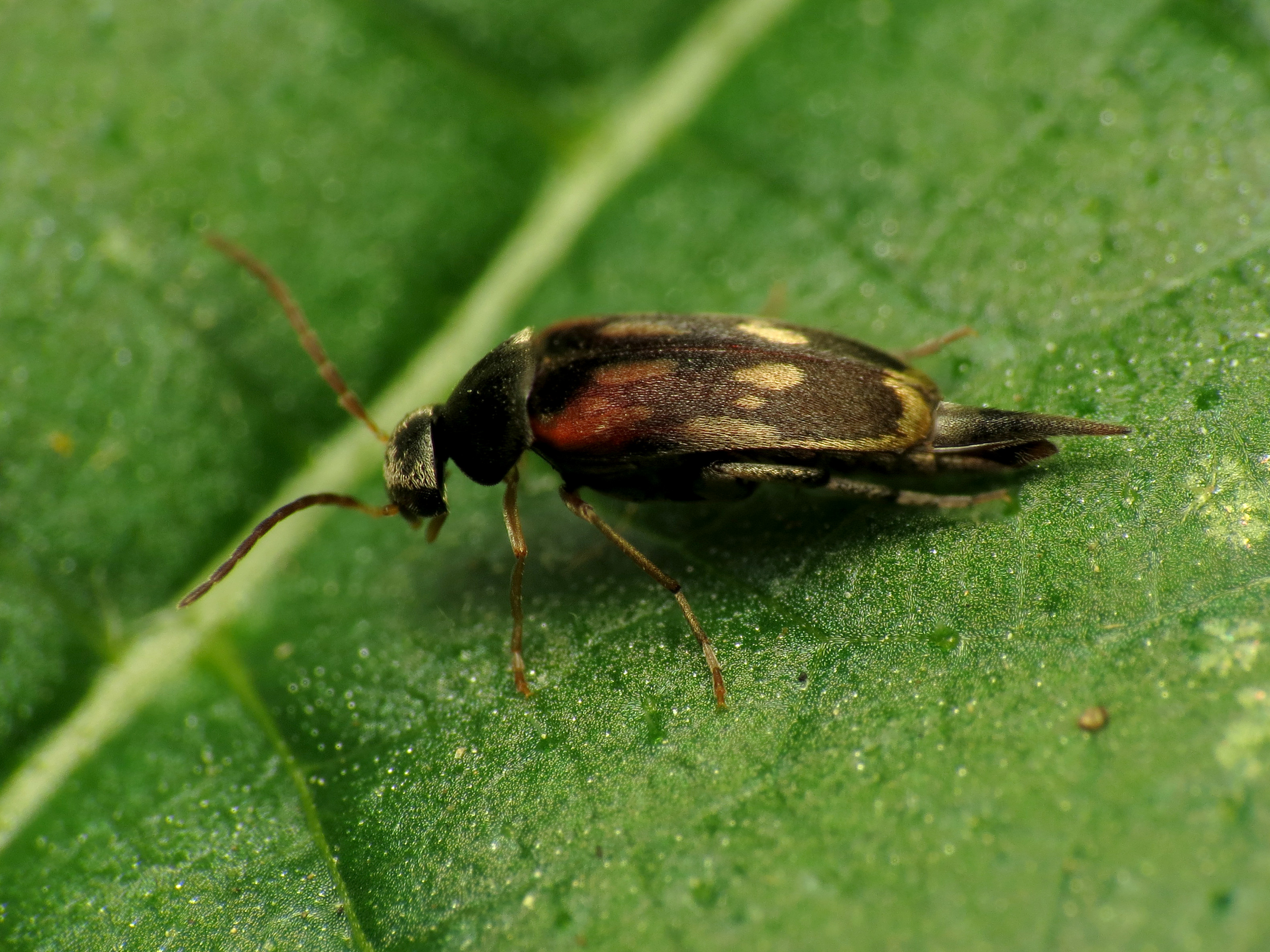

Scientific classification
- Domain: Eukaryota
- Kingdom: Animalia
- Phylum: Arthropoda
- Class: Insecta
- Order: Coleoptera
- Suborder: Polyphaga
- Infraorder: Cucujiformia
- Family: Mordellidae
- Tribe: Mordellistenini
- Genus: Falsomordellistena
- Species: F. bihamata

Binomial name
- Falsomordellistena bihamata (Melsheimer, 1845)

Synonyms
- Mordellistena bihamata (Melsheimer, 1846)

= Falsomordellistena bihamata =

Species of beetle

Falsomordellistena bihamata is a species of tumbling flower beetle in the family Mordellidae. It is found in North America.
