= Baltistena korschefskyi =

Scientific classification
- Domain: Eukaryota
- Kingdom: Animalia
- Phylum: Arthropoda
- Class: Insecta
- Order: Coleoptera
- Suborder: Polyphaga
- Infraorder: Cucujiformia
- Family: Mordellidae
- Subfamily: Mordellinae
- Tribe: Mordellistenini
- Genus: †Baltistena
- Species: †B. korschefskyi

Binomial name
- †Baltistena korschefskyi (Ermisch, 1941)

Synonyms
- Mordellistena korschefskyi Ermisch, 1941

Species of beetle

Baltistena korschefskyi is a fossil species of tumbling flower beetles in the family Mordellidae. It was described in 1941 by Ermisch.
