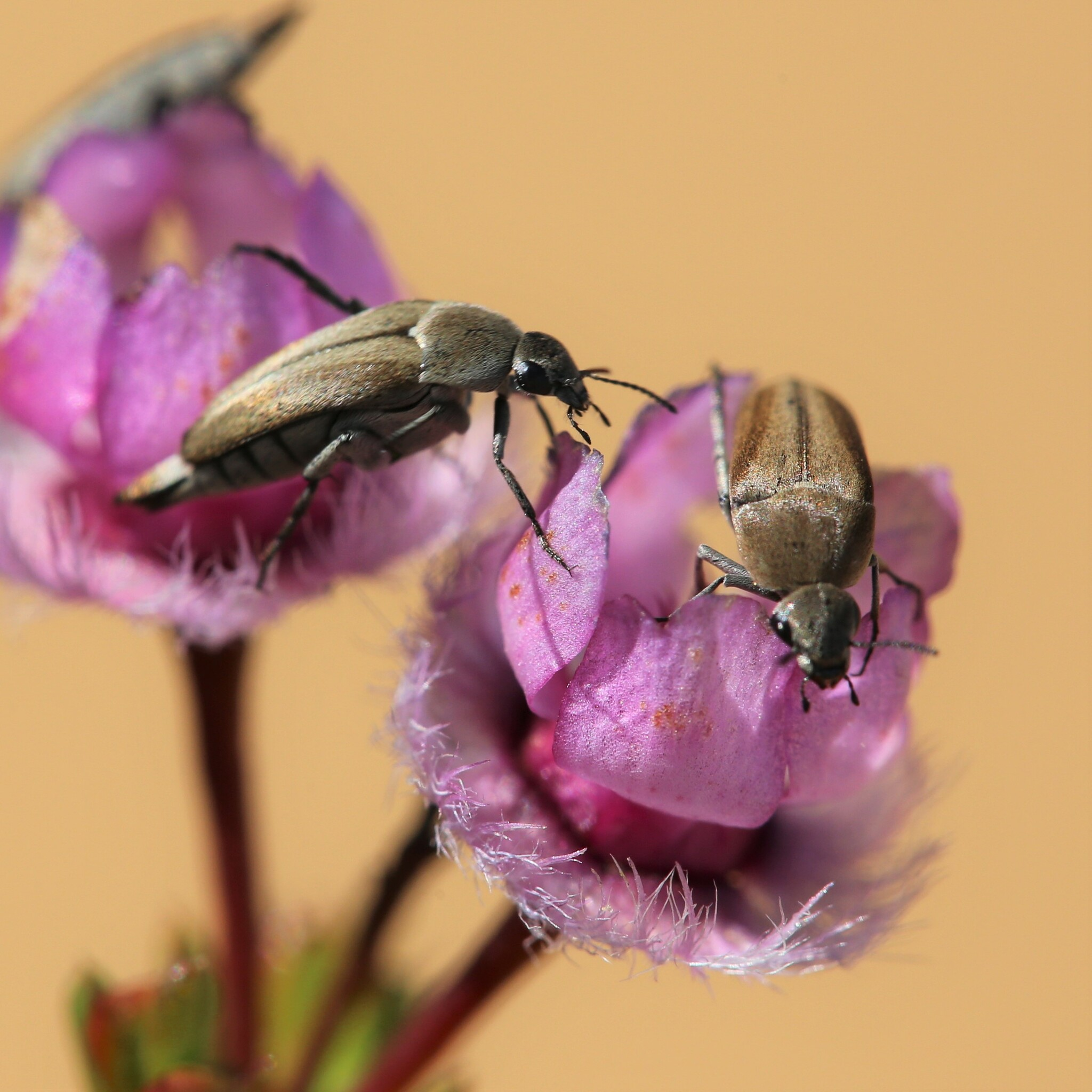
- Austromordella verticordiae, Australia

Scientific classification
- Domain: Eukaryota
- Kingdom: Animalia
- Phylum: Arthropoda
- Class: Insecta
- Order: Coleoptera
- Suborder: Polyphaga
- Infraorder: Cucujiformia
- Family: Mordellidae
- Subfamily: Mordellinae
- Tribe: Mordellini
- Genus: Austromordella
- Species: A. verticordiae

Binomial name
- Austromordella verticordiae (Lea, 1902)

= Austromordella verticordiae =

Species of beetle

Austromordella verticordiae is a species of tumbling flower beetles in the family Mordellidae. They are found in Australia.
