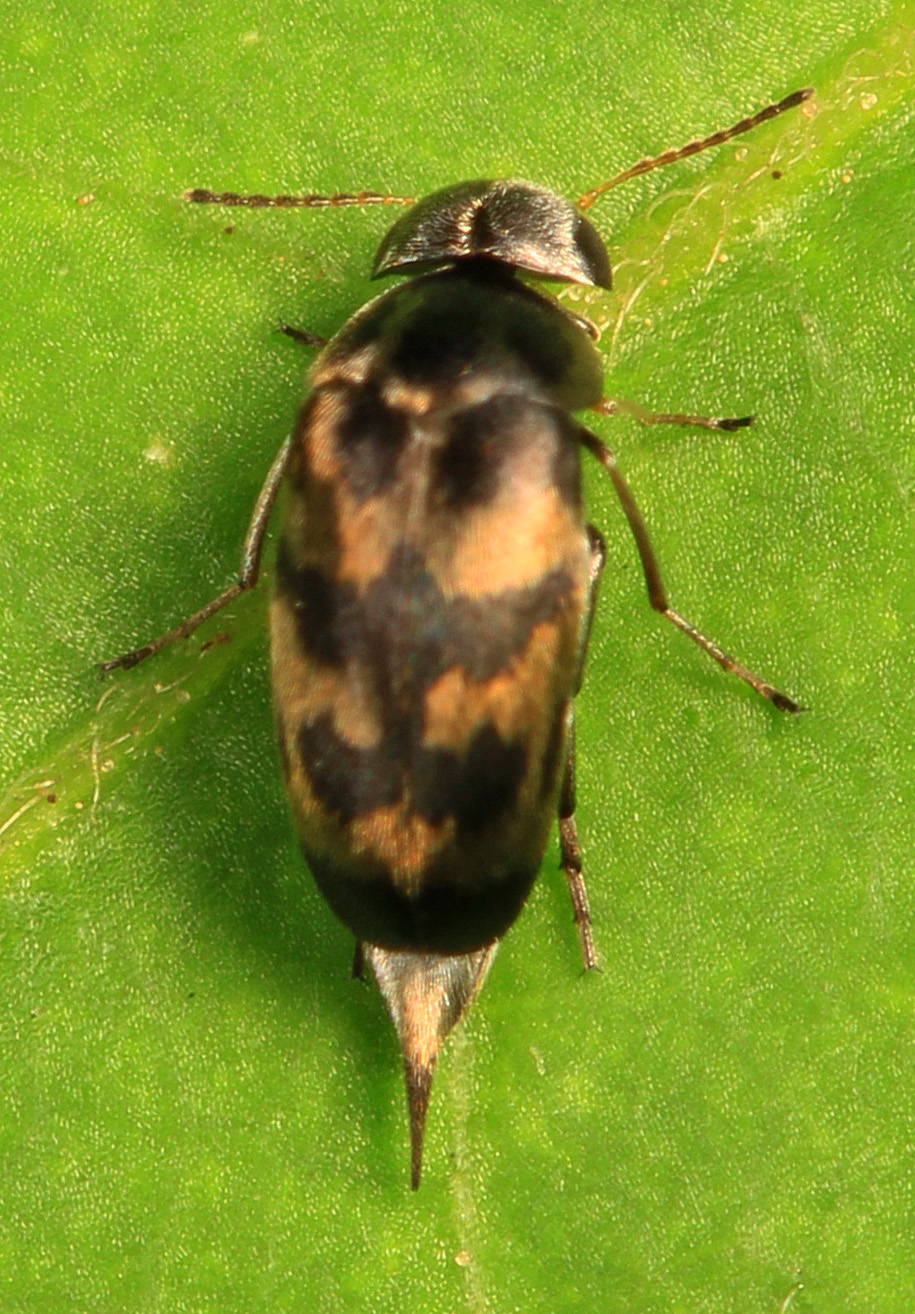
- Paramordellaria triloba

Scientific classification
- Domain: Eukaryota
- Kingdom: Animalia
- Phylum: Arthropoda
- Class: Insecta
- Order: Coleoptera
- Suborder: Polyphaga
- Infraorder: Cucujiformia
- Family: Mordellidae
- Subfamily: Mordellinae
- Tribe: Mordellini
- Genus: Paramordellaria
- Species: P. triloba

Binomial name
- Paramordellaria triloba (Say, 1824)

Synonyms
- Tomoxia triloba (Say, 1824); Mordella triloba Say, 1824

= Paramordellaria triloba =

Species of beetles

Paramordellaria triloba is a species of tumbling flower beetle in the family Mordellidae. It is found in North America.
