= Pselaphokentron aculeatum =

Scientific classification
- Domain: Eukaryota
- Kingdom: Animalia
- Phylum: Arthropoda
- Class: Insecta
- Order: Coleoptera
- Suborder: Polyphaga
- Infraorder: Cucujiformia
- Family: Mordellidae
- Genus: Pselaphokentron
- Species: P. aculeatum

Binomial name
- Pselaphokentron aculeatum Franciscolo, 1990

Species of beetle

Pselaphokentron aculeatum is a beetle in the genus Pselaphokentron of the family Mordellidae. It was described in 1990 by Franciscolo.
