= Tolidopalpus castaneicolor =

Scientific classification
- Domain: Eukaryota
- Kingdom: Animalia
- Phylum: Arthropoda
- Class: Insecta
- Order: Coleoptera
- Suborder: Polyphaga
- Infraorder: Cucujiformia
- Family: Mordellidae
- Genus: Tolidopalpus
- Species: T. castaneicolor

Binomial name
- Tolidopalpus castaneicolor Ermisch, 1952

Species of beetle

Tolidopalpus castaneicolor is a beetle in the genus Tolidopalpus of the family Mordellidae. It was described in 1952 by Ermisch.
