= Adelptes =

Scientific classification
- Domain: Eukaryota
- Kingdom: Animalia
- Phylum: Arthropoda
- Class: Insecta
- Order: Coleoptera
- Suborder: Polyphaga
- Infraorder: Cucujiformia
- Family: Mordellidae
- Subfamily: Mordellinae
- Tribe: Mordellini
- Genus: Adelptes; Franciscolo, 1965
- Species: A. clavipalpis

Binomial name
- Adelptes clavipalpis Franciscolo, 1965

Synonyms
- Aelptes Franciscolo, 1965

Genus of beetles

Adelptes is a genus of tumbling flower beetles in the family Mordellidae. This genus has at least one species, Adelptes clavipalpis.
