= Xanthomorda elegantissima =

Scientific classification
- Domain: Eukaryota
- Kingdom: Animalia
- Phylum: Arthropoda
- Class: Insecta
- Order: Coleoptera
- Suborder: Polyphaga
- Infraorder: Cucujiformia
- Family: Mordellidae
- Genus: Xanthomorda
- Species: X. elegantissima

Binomial name
- Xanthomorda elegantissima Batten, 1990

Species of beetle

Xanthomorda elegantissima is a beetle in the genus Xanthomorda of the family Mordellidae. It was described in 1990 by Batten.
