= Fahraeusiella =

Scientific classification
- Domain: Eukaryota
- Kingdom: Animalia
- Phylum: Arthropoda
- Class: Insecta
- Order: Coleoptera
- Suborder: Polyphaga
- Infraorder: Cucujiformia
- Family: Mordellidae
- Subfamily: Mordellinae
- Tribe: Mordellistenini
- Genus: Fahraeusiella; Ermisch, 1953

Species of beetle

Fahraeusiella moerens is a species of beetle in the family Mordellidae, the only species in the genus Fahraeusiella.
