= Falsomordellina amamiana =

Scientific classification
- Kingdom: Animalia
- Phylum: Arthropoda
- Class: Insecta
- Order: Coleoptera
- Suborder: Polyphaga
- Infraorder: Cucujiformia
- Family: Mordellidae
- Genus: Falsomordellina
- Species: F. amamiana

Binomial name
- Falsomordellina amamiana (Nomura, 1961)

Synonyms
- Glipostenoda amamiana Nomura, 1961

Species of beetle

Falsomordellina amamiana is a species of beetle in the genus Falsomordellina. It was described in 1961.
