= Plesitomoxia =

Scientific classification
- Domain: Eukaryota
- Kingdom: Animalia
- Phylum: Arthropoda
- Class: Insecta
- Order: Coleoptera
- Suborder: Polyphaga
- Infraorder: Cucujiformia
- Family: Mordellidae
- Subfamily: Mordellinae
- Tribe: Mordellini
- Genus: Plesitomoxia; Ermisch, 1955

Genus of beetles

Plesitomoxia is a genus of tumbling flower beetles in the family Mordellidae, found in Australia.

== Species ==
These species belong to the genus Plesitomoxia

- Plesitomoxia atra Ermisch, 1962
- Plesitomoxia obliquialba (Lea, 1925)
