= Tomoxioda aterrima =

Scientific classification
- Kingdom: Animalia
- Phylum: Arthropoda
- Class: Insecta
- Order: Coleoptera
- Suborder: Polyphaga
- Infraorder: Cucujiformia
- Family: Mordellidae
- Genus: Tomoxioda
- Species: T. aterrima

Binomial name
- Tomoxioda aterrima (McLeay, 1872)

Synonyms
- Tomoxia aterrima McLeay, 1872

Species of beetle

Tomoxioda aterrima is a species of beetle in the genus Tomoxioda of the family Mordellidae. It was described in 1872.
