= Calycemorda =

Scientific classification
- Domain: Eukaryota
- Kingdom: Animalia
- Phylum: Arthropoda
- Class: Insecta
- Order: Coleoptera
- Suborder: Polyphaga
- Infraorder: Cucujiformia
- Family: Mordellidae
- Subfamily: Mordellinae
- Tribe: Mordellistenini
- Genus: Calycemorda; Ermisch, 1969

Genus of beetles

Calycemorda is a genus of tumbling flower beetles in the family Mordellidae, found in central and south Africa.

== Species ==
These species belong to the genus Calycemorda.

- Calycemorda brasiliensis Ermisch, 1969
- Calycemorda lemoulti (Pic 1929)
- Calycemorda kamerunensis Ermisch, 1969
