= Stenomordella longeantennalis =

Scientific classification
- Domain: Eukaryota
- Kingdom: Animalia
- Phylum: Arthropoda
- Class: Insecta
- Order: Coleoptera
- Suborder: Polyphaga
- Infraorder: Cucujiformia
- Family: Mordellidae
- Genus: Stenomordella
- Species: S. longeantennalis

Binomial name
- Stenomordella longeantennalis Ermisch, 1941

Species of beetle

Stenomordella longeantennalis is a species of beetle in the genus Stenomordella of the family Mordellidae. It was described in 1941.
