= Tolidopalpus dohertyi =

Scientific classification
- Kingdom: Animalia
- Phylum: Arthropoda
- Class: Insecta
- Order: Coleoptera
- Suborder: Polyphaga
- Infraorder: Cucujiformia
- Family: Mordellidae
- Genus: Tolidopalpus
- Species: T. dohertyi

Binomial name
- Tolidopalpus dohertyi (Píc, 1917)

Synonyms
- Mordellistena dohertyi Pic, 1917

Species of beetle

Tolidopalpus dohertyi is a beetle in the family Mordellidae, occurring in Indonesia, Malaysia and Thailand. It was described in 1917 by Maurice Pic.
