= Paratomoxioda curvipalpis =

Scientific classification
- Kingdom: Animalia
- Phylum: Arthropoda
- Class: Insecta
- Order: Coleoptera
- Suborder: Polyphaga
- Infraorder: Cucujiformia
- Family: Mordellidae
- Genus: Paratomoxioda
- Species: P. curvipalpis

Binomial name
- Paratomoxioda curvipalpis (Stshegoleva-Barovskaya, 1930)

Synonyms
- Mordella curvipalpis Stshegoleva-Barovskaya, 1930

Species of beetle

Paratomoxioda curvipalpis is a species of tumbling flower beetle in the family Mordellidae.
