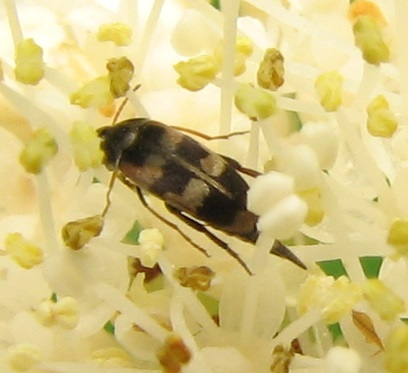

Scientific classification
- Domain: Eukaryota
- Kingdom: Animalia
- Phylum: Arthropoda
- Class: Insecta
- Order: Coleoptera
- Suborder: Polyphaga
- Infraorder: Cucujiformia
- Family: Mordellidae
- Genus: Falsomordellistena
- Species: F. pubescens

Binomial name
- Falsomordellistena pubescens (Fabricius, 1798)

Synonyms
- Mordellistena pubescens (Fabricius, 1798)

= Falsomordellistena pubescens =

Species of beetle

Falsomordellistena pubescens is a species of tumbling flower beetle in the family Mordellidae. It is found in Central and North America, from Panama to Canada.
