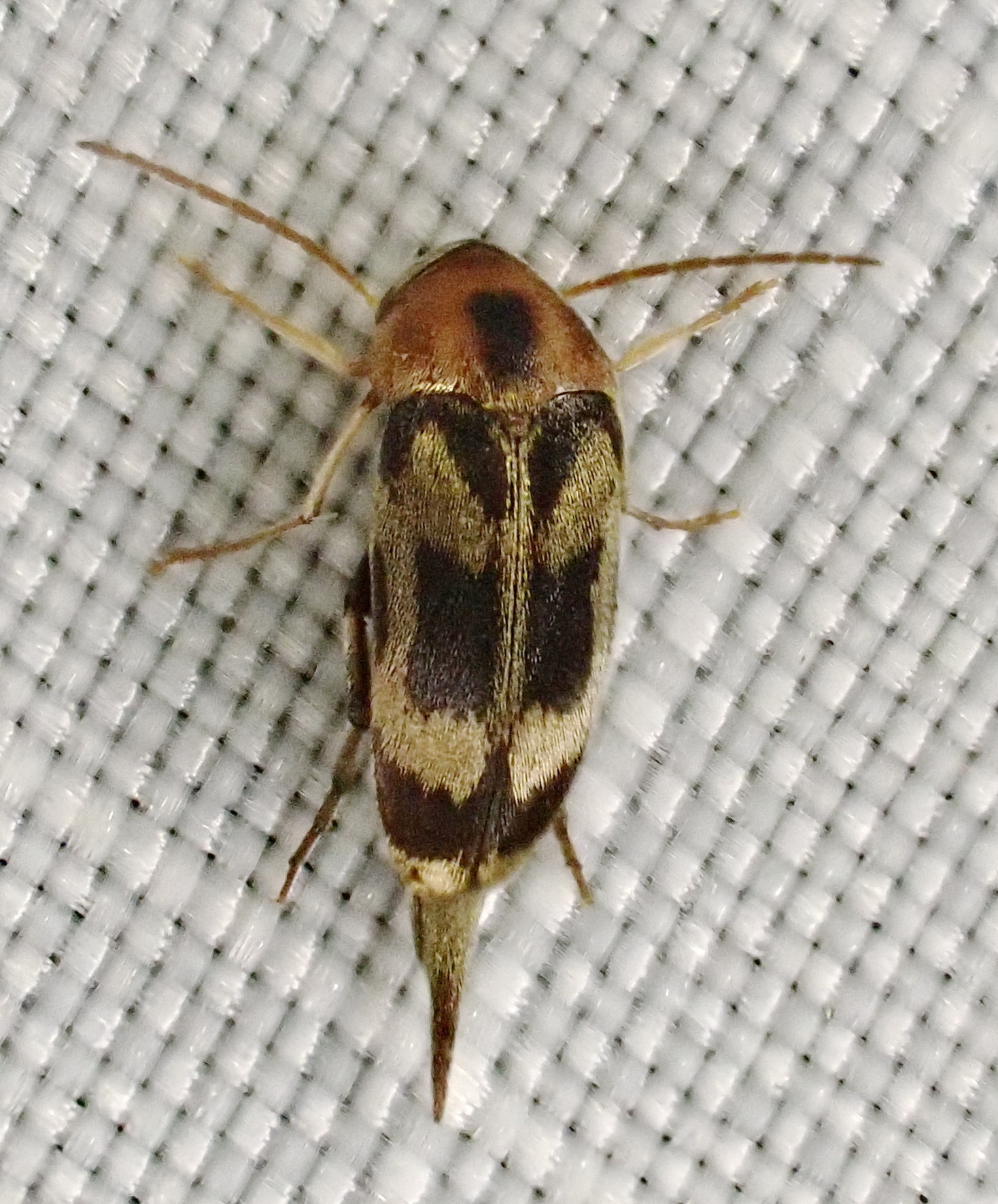
- Falsomordellistena hebraica, Virginia

Scientific classification
- Domain: Eukaryota
- Kingdom: Animalia
- Phylum: Arthropoda
- Class: Insecta
- Order: Coleoptera
- Suborder: Polyphaga
- Infraorder: Cucujiformia
- Family: Mordellidae
- Genus: Falsomordellistena
- Species: F. hebraica

Binomial name
- Falsomordellistena hebraica (LeConte, 1862)

Synonyms
- Mordellistena hebraica LeConte, 1862

= Falsomordellistena hebraica =

Species of beetle

Falsomordellistena hebraica is a species of tumbling flower beetle in the family Mordellidae. It is found in North America from Mexico to Canada.
