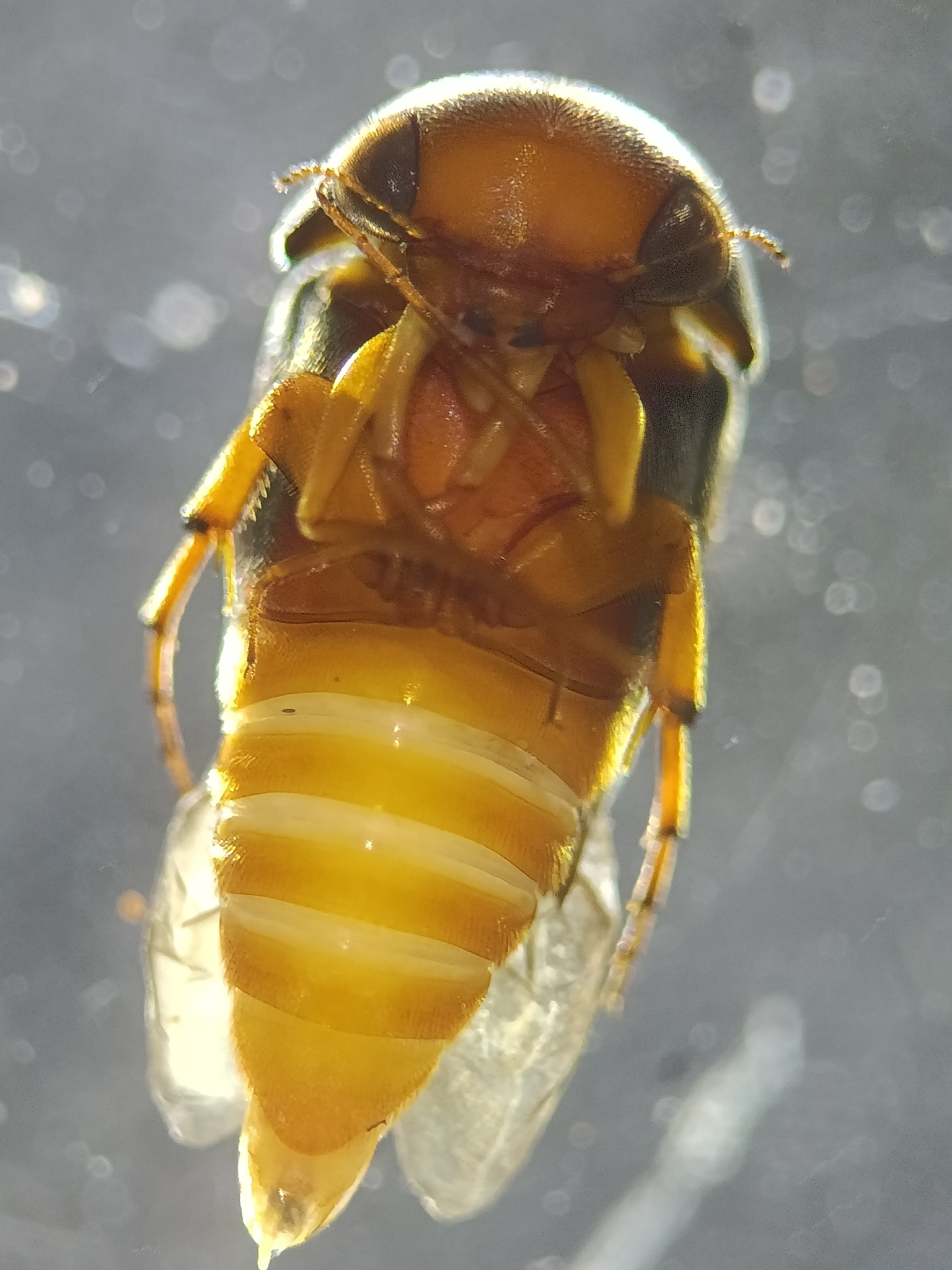
- Boatia albertae, Colombia

Scientific classification
- Domain: Eukaryota
- Kingdom: Animalia
- Phylum: Arthropoda
- Class: Insecta
- Order: Coleoptera
- Suborder: Polyphaga
- Infraorder: Cucujiformia
- Family: Mordellidae
- Subfamily: Mordellinae
- Tribe: Mordellini
- Genus: Boatia; Franciscolo, 1985
- Species: B. albertae

Binomial name
- Boatia albertae Franciscolo, 1985

= Boatia =

Boatia albertae

Species of beetle

Boatia albertae is a species of beetles in the family Mordellidae, the only species in the genus Boatia. It is found in South America.
