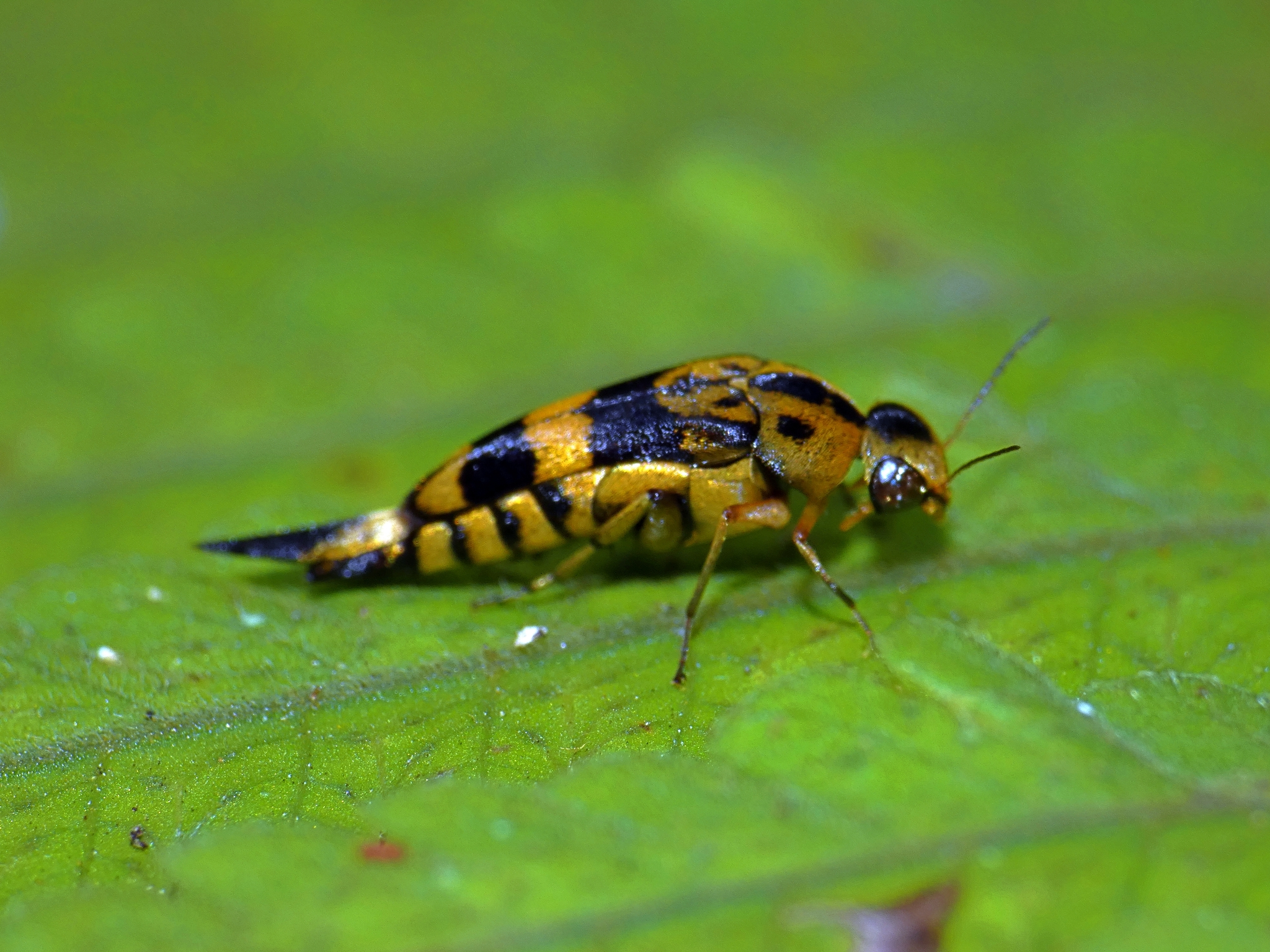
- Ophthalmoglipa elongatula, Australia

Scientific classification
- Domain: Eukaryota
- Kingdom: Animalia
- Phylum: Arthropoda
- Class: Insecta
- Order: Coleoptera
- Suborder: Polyphaga
- Infraorder: Cucujiformia
- Family: Mordellidae
- Subfamily: Mordellinae
- Tribe: Mordellini
- Genus: Ophthalmoglipa; Franciscolo, 1952

= Ophthalmoglipa =

Genus of beetles

Ophthalmoglipa is a genus of tumbling flower beetles in the family Mordellidae. There are at least eight described species in Ophthalmoglipa.

== Species ==
These three species belong to the genus Ophthalmoglipa:

- Ophthalmoglipa aurocaudata (Fairmaire, 1897)
- Ophthalmoglipa australis Franciscolo, 1952
- Ophthalmoglipa bilyi Horák, 1998
- Ophthalmoglipa elongatula (Mac Leay, 1872)
- Ophthalmoglipa horaki Ruzzier, 2015
- Ophthalmoglipa iriana Horák, 1998
- Ophthalmoglipa leblanci Ruzzier, 2015
- Ophthalmoglipa maranoelai Horák, 1998
