= Paramordellistena =

Scientific classification
- Domain: Eukaryota
- Kingdom: Animalia
- Phylum: Arthropoda
- Class: Insecta
- Order: Coleoptera
- Suborder: Polyphaga
- Infraorder: Cucujiformia
- Family: Mordellidae
- Subfamily: Mordellinae
- Tribe: Mordellistenini
- Genus: Paramordellistena; Ermisch, 1950
- Species: P. exilis

Binomial name
- Paramordellistena exilis (Germar, 1848)

Synonyms
- Mordella exilis Germar, 1848; Paramordellistena longipalpis Ermisch, 1950

Genus of beetles

Paramordellistena is a genus of tumbling flower beetles in the family Mordellidae. It has a single species Paramordellistena exilis, found in Australia.
