= Trichotomoxia =

Scientific classification
- Domain: Eukaryota
- Kingdom: Animalia
- Phylum: Arthropoda
- Class: Insecta
- Order: Coleoptera
- Suborder: Polyphaga
- Infraorder: Cucujiformia
- Family: Mordellidae
- Subfamily: Mordellinae
- Tribe: Mordellini
- Genus: Trichotomoxia; Franciscolo, 1950

Genus of beetles

Trichotomoxia is a genus of tumbling flower beetles in the family Mordellidae. Its sole species is Trichotomoxia chubbi.
