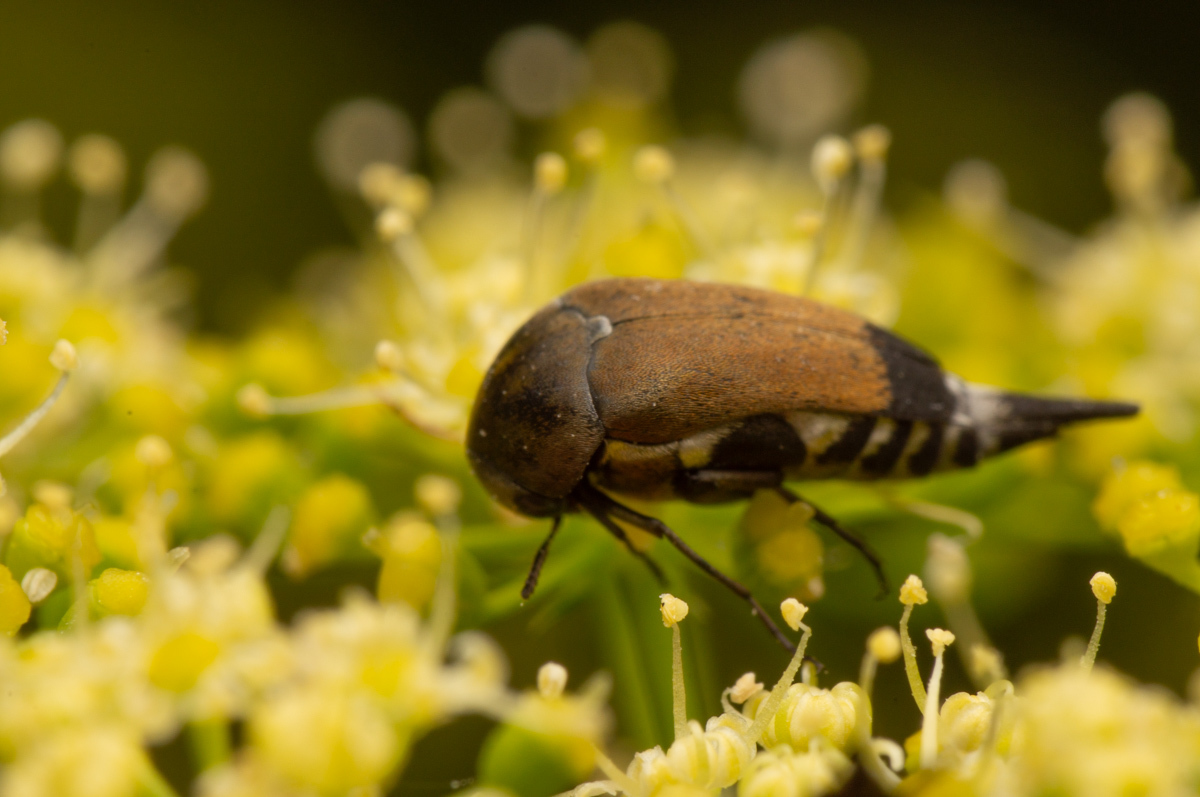
- Tomoxioda apicata, Australia

Scientific classification
- Kingdom: Animalia
- Phylum: Arthropoda
- Class: Insecta
- Order: Coleoptera
- Suborder: Polyphaga
- Infraorder: Cucujiformia
- Family: Mordellidae
- Subfamily: Mordellinae
- Tribe: Mordellini
- Genus: Tomoxioda; Ermisch, 1950

= Tomoxioda =

Genus of beetles

Tomoxioda is a genus of tumbling flower beetles in the family Mordellidae. There are at least four described species in Tomoxioda.

== Species ==
These species belong to the genus Tomoxioda:

- Tomoxioda apicata (Lea, 1902) (Australia)
- Tomoxioda aterrima (Macleay, W.J., 1872) (Australia)
- Tomoxioda melasoma (Lea, 1917) (Australia)
- Tomoxioda truncatoptera (Nomura, 1958) (Japan, temperate Asia)
