= Ophthalmoglipa australis =

Scientific classification
- Domain: Eukaryota
- Kingdom: Animalia
- Phylum: Arthropoda
- Class: Insecta
- Order: Coleoptera
- Suborder: Polyphaga
- Infraorder: Cucujiformia
- Family: Mordellidae
- Genus: Ophthalmoglipa
- Species: O. australis

Binomial name
- Ophthalmoglipa australis Franciscolo, 1952

Species of beetle

Ophthalmoglipa australis is a species of beetle in the genus Ophthalmoglipa of the family Mordellidae. It was described in 1952.
