= Reynoldsiella =

Scientific classification
- Domain: Eukaryota
- Kingdom: Animalia
- Phylum: Arthropoda
- Class: Insecta
- Order: Coleoptera
- Suborder: Polyphaga
- Infraorder: Cucujiformia
- Family: Mordellidae
- Subfamily: Mordellinae
- Tribe: Reynoldsiellini
- Genus: Reynoldsiella; Ray, 1930
- Species: R. parallela

Binomial name
- Reynoldsiella parallela Ray, 1930

Genus of beetles

Reynoldsiella is a genus of tumbling flower beetles in the family Mordellidae. There is a single species in this genus, Reynoldsiella parallela, known from Venezuela.
