= Stenomordella =

Scientific classification
- Domain: Eukaryota
- Kingdom: Animalia
- Phylum: Arthropoda
- Class: Insecta
- Order: Coleoptera
- Suborder: Polyphaga
- Infraorder: Cucujiformia
- Family: Mordellidae
- Subfamily: Mordellinae
- Tribe: Mordellini
- Genus: Stenomordella; Ermisch, 1941

Genus of beetles

Stenomordella is a genus of tumbling flower beetles in the family Mordellidae, found in Sri Lanka, China, Vietnam and Japan.

== Species ==
The following species belong to the genus Stenomordella.

- Stenomordella ochii Kiyoyama, 1975 (China (Jiangxi); Vietnam, Japan)
- Stenomordella longeantennalis Ermisch, 1941 (China (Fujian, Jiangxi, Yunnan)).
- Stenomordella saueri Horák, 2009 (Sri Lanka)
