= Congomorda =

Scientific classification
- Domain: Eukaryota
- Kingdom: Animalia
- Phylum: Arthropoda
- Class: Insecta
- Order: Coleoptera
- Suborder: Polyphaga
- Infraorder: Cucujiformia
- Family: Mordellidae
- Subfamily: Mordellinae
- Tribe: Mordellini
- Genus: Congomorda; Ermisch, 1955

Genus of beetles

Congomorda is a genus of tumbling flower beetles in the family Mordellidae, found in Southeast Asia.

== Species ==
- Congomorda atra Ermisch, 1955
- Congomorda orientalis Horák, 2009
