= Mordellapygium elongatum =

Scientific classification
- Kingdom: Animalia
- Phylum: Arthropoda
- Class: Insecta
- Order: Coleoptera
- Suborder: Polyphaga
- Infraorder: Cucujiformia
- Family: Mordellidae
- Genus: Mordellapygium
- Species: M. elongatum

Binomial name
- Mordellapygium elongatum Ray, 1930

Species of beetle

Mordellapygium elongatum is a species of beetle in the genus Mordellapygium of the family Mordellidae. It was described in 1930.
