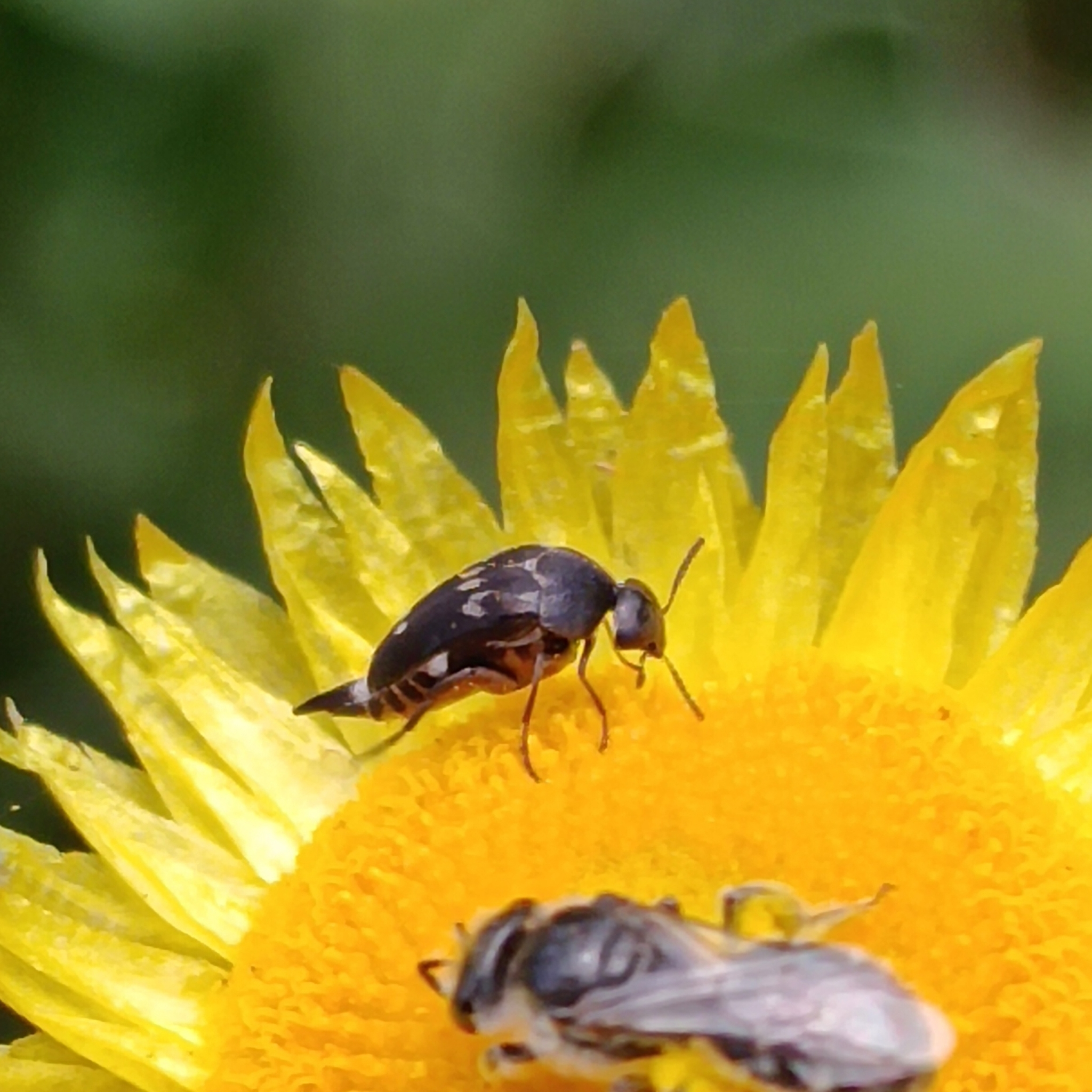
- Sphaeromorda natalensis, South Africa

Scientific classification
- Domain: Eukaryota
- Kingdom: Animalia
- Phylum: Arthropoda
- Class: Insecta
- Order: Coleoptera
- Suborder: Polyphaga
- Infraorder: Cucujiformia
- Family: Mordellidae
- Subfamily: Mordellinae
- Tribe: Mordellini
- Genus: Sphaeromorda; Franciscolo, 1950

Synonyms
- Pseudomordella Ermisch, 1953

= Sphaeromorda =

Genus of beetles

Sphaeromorda is a genus of tumbling flower beetles in the family Mordellidae.

== Species ==
These species belong to the genus Sphaeromorda.

- Sphaeromorda atterrima Ermisch, 1954
- Sphaeromorda caffra (Fahraeus, 1870)
- Sphaeromorda intermedia
- Sphaeromorda interrupta
- Sphaeromorda magnithorax Franciscolo, 1965
- Sphaeromorda natalensis Franciscolo 1950
- Sphaeromorda velutinoides Franciscolo, 1965
- Sphaeromorda weisei
