= Tolidopalpus bimaculatus =

Scientific classification
- Domain: Eukaryota
- Kingdom: Animalia
- Phylum: Arthropoda
- Class: Insecta
- Order: Coleoptera
- Suborder: Polyphaga
- Infraorder: Cucujiformia
- Family: Mordellidae
- Genus: Tolidopalpus
- Species: T. bimaculatus

Binomial name
- Tolidopalpus bimaculatus Shiyake, 1997

Species of beetle

Tolidopalpus bimaculatus is a beetle in the genus Tolidopalpus of the family Mordellidae. It was described in 1997 by Shiyake.
