= Calycemorda brasiliensis =

Scientific classification
- Domain: Eukaryota
- Kingdom: Animalia
- Phylum: Arthropoda
- Class: Insecta
- Order: Coleoptera
- Suborder: Polyphaga
- Infraorder: Cucujiformia
- Family: Mordellidae
- Genus: Calycemorda
- Species: C. brasiliensis

Binomial name
- Calycemorda brasiliensis Ermisch, 1969

Species of beetle

Calycemorda brasiliensis is a species of beetle in the genus Calycemorda. It was discovered in 1969.
