= Paratomoxioda harteni =

Scientific classification
- Kingdom: Animalia
- Phylum: Arthropoda
- Class: Insecta
- Order: Coleoptera
- Suborder: Polyphaga
- Infraorder: Cucujiformia
- Family: Mordellidae
- Genus: Paratomoxioda
- Species: P. harteni

Binomial name
- Paratomoxioda harteni (Horak, 2009)

Species of beetle

Paratomoxioda harteni is a species of tumbling flower beetle in the family Mordellidae.
