= Tolida =

Scientific classification
- Domain: Eukaryota
- Kingdom: Animalia
- Phylum: Arthropoda
- Class: Insecta
- Order: Coleoptera
- Suborder: Polyphaga
- Infraorder: Cucujiformia
- Family: Mordellidae
- Subfamily: Mordellinae
- Tribe: Mordellistenini
- Genus: Tolida; Mulsant, 1856
- Species: T. artemisiae

Binomial name
- Tolida artemisiae (Mulsant, 1856)

Genus of beetles

Tolida is a genus of tumbling flower beetles in the family Mordellidae. This genus has a single species, Tolida artemisiae, found in Europe.
