= Pseudodellamora =

Scientific classification
- Domain: Eukaryota
- Kingdom: Animalia
- Phylum: Arthropoda
- Class: Insecta
- Order: Coleoptera
- Suborder: Polyphaga
- Infraorder: Cucujiformia
- Family: Mordellidae
- Subfamily: Mordellinae
- Tribe: Mordellistenini
- Genus: Pseudodellamora; Ermisch, 1941

Genus of beetles

Pseudodellamora is a genus of tumbling flower beetles in the family Mordellidae. There are at least two described species in Pseudodellamora.

== Species ==
These two species belong to the genus Pseudodellamora:

- Pseudodellamora championi Schilsky, 1899
- Pseudodellamora distinguenda Ermisch, 1963
