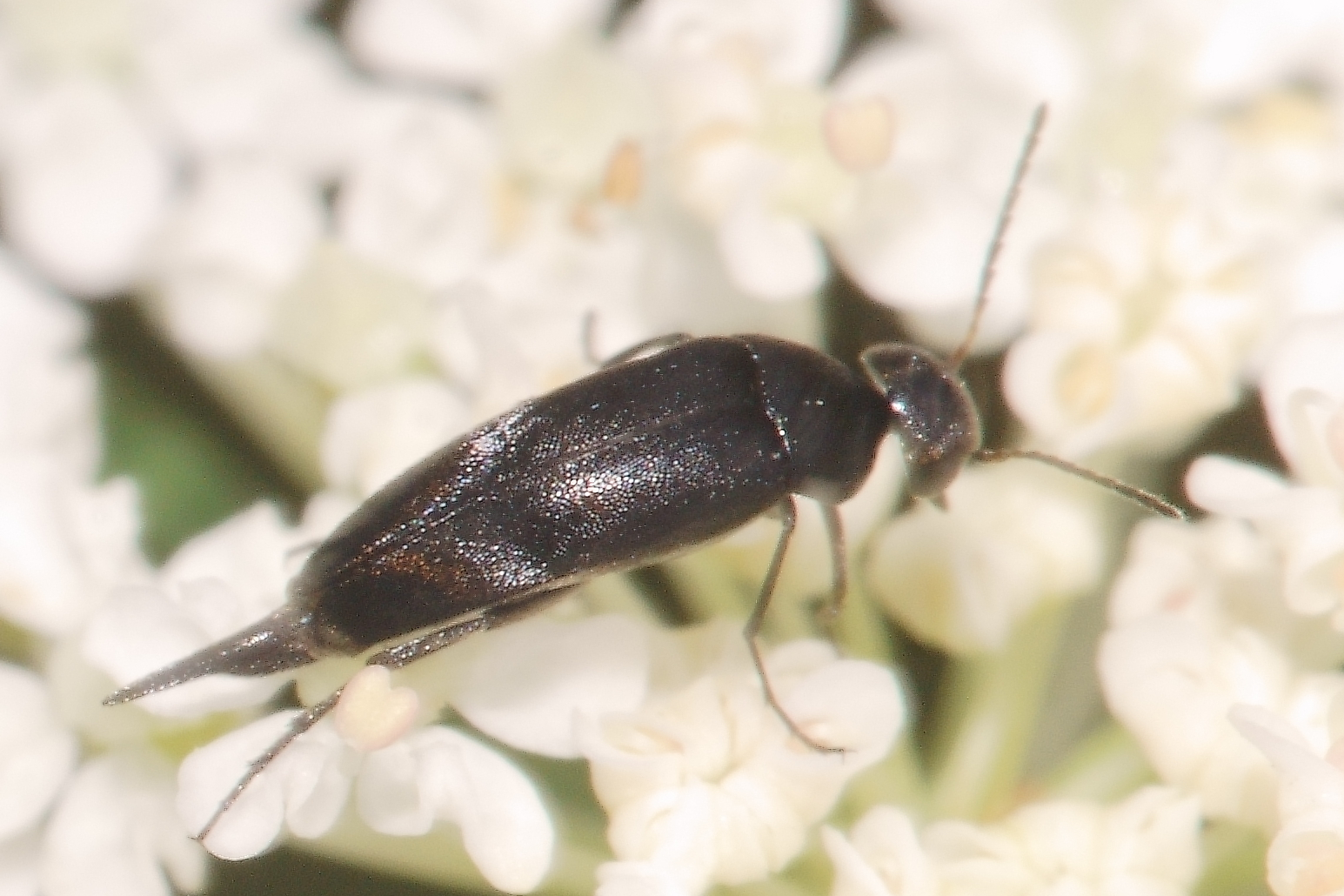
- Stenomordellaria neglecta, New Zealand

Scientific classification
- Kingdom: Animalia
- Phylum: Arthropoda
- Class: Insecta
- Order: Coleoptera
- Suborder: Polyphaga
- Infraorder: Cucujiformia
- Family: Mordellidae
- Subfamily: Mordellinae
- Tribe: Mordellini
- Genus: Stenomordellaria; Ermisch, 1950
- Species: S. neglecta

Binomial name
- Stenomordellaria neglecta (Broun, 1880)

= Stenomordellaria =

Genus of beetles

Stenomordellaria is a genus of tumbling flower beetles in the family Mordellidae. This genus has a single species, Stenomordellaria neglecta, found in New Zealand.
