= Ophthalmoglipa bilyi =

Scientific classification
- Domain: Eukaryota
- Kingdom: Animalia
- Phylum: Arthropoda
- Class: Insecta
- Order: Coleoptera
- Suborder: Polyphaga
- Infraorder: Cucujiformia
- Family: Mordellidae
- Genus: Ophthalmoglipa
- Species: O. bilyi

Binomial name
- Ophthalmoglipa bilyi Horák, 1998

Species of beetle

Ophthalmoglipa bilyi is a species of beetle in the genus Ophthalmoglipa of the family Mordellidae. It was described in 1998.
