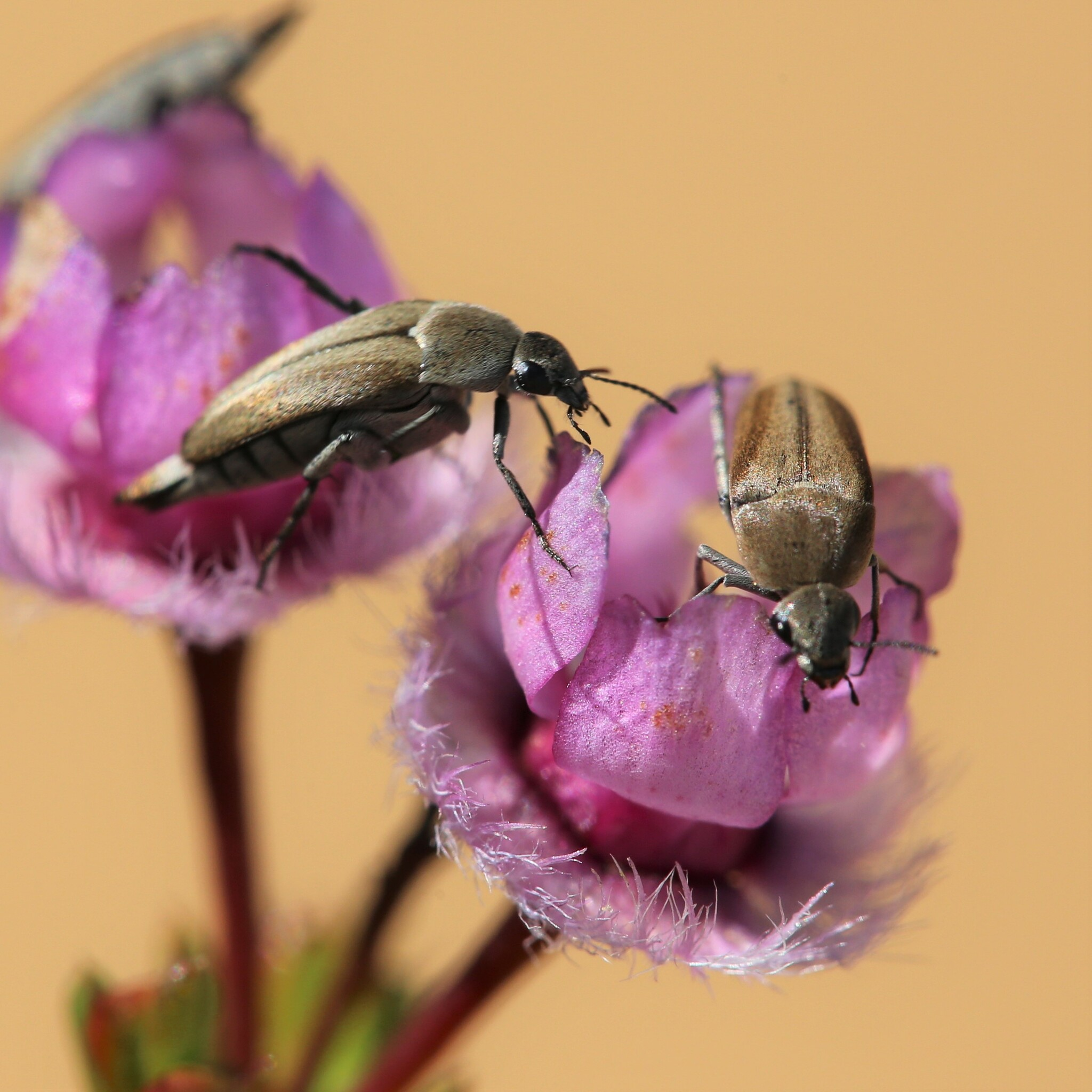
- Austromordella verticordiae, Australia

Scientific classification
- Domain: Eukaryota
- Kingdom: Animalia
- Phylum: Arthropoda
- Class: Insecta
- Order: Coleoptera
- Suborder: Polyphaga
- Infraorder: Cucujiformia
- Family: Mordellidae
- Subfamily: Mordellinae
- Tribe: Mordellini
- Genus: Austromordella; Ermisch, 1950

Type species
- Austromordella tarsata Ermisch, 1950

= Austromordella =

Genus of beetles

Austromordella is a genus of tumbling flower beetles in the family Mordellidae. They are found in Australia.

== Species ==
These species are members of the genus Austromordella.

- Austromordella demarzi Ermisch, 1963
- Austromordella niveosuturalis (Lea, 1917)
- Austromordella verticordiae (Lea, 1902)
