= Paraphungia =

Scientific classification
- Domain: Eukaryota
- Kingdom: Animalia
- Phylum: Arthropoda
- Class: Insecta
- Order: Coleoptera
- Suborder: Polyphaga
- Infraorder: Cucujiformia
- Family: Mordellidae
- Subfamily: Mordellinae
- Tribe: Mordellini
- Genus: Paraphungia; Ermisch, 1969
- Species: P. laosensis

Binomial name
- Paraphungia laosensis Ermisch, 1969

Genus of beetles

Paraphungia is a genus of tumbling flower beetles in the family Mordellidae. It has a single species, Paraphungia laosensis, found in Laos.
