= Pseudodellamora distinguenda =

Scientific classification
- Domain: Eukaryota
- Kingdom: Animalia
- Phylum: Arthropoda
- Class: Insecta
- Order: Coleoptera
- Suborder: Polyphaga
- Infraorder: Cucujiformia
- Family: Mordellidae
- Genus: Pseudodellamora
- Species: P. distinguenda

Binomial name
- Pseudodellamora distinguenda Ermisch, 1963

Species of beetle

Pseudodellamora distinguenda is a beetle in the genus Pseudodellamora of the family Mordellidae. It was described in 1963 by Ermisch.
