= Cretanaspis =

Scientific classification
- Domain: Eukaryota
- Kingdom: Animalia
- Phylum: Arthropoda
- Class: Insecta
- Order: Coleoptera
- Suborder: Polyphaga
- Infraorder: Cucujiformia
- Family: Mordellidae
- Subfamily: Mordellinae
- Tribe: Mordellini
- Genus: †Cretanaspis; Huang & Yang, 1999
- Species: †C. lushangfenensis

Binomial name
- †Cretanaspis lushangfenensis Huang & Yang, 1999

Synonyms
- Cretamordella

Genus of beetles

Cretanaspis is an extinct genus of tumbling flower beetles in the family Mordellidae. This genus has a single species, Cretanaspis lushangfenensis, discovered in China.
