= Cothurus bordoni =

Scientific classification
- Domain: Eukaryota
- Kingdom: Animalia
- Phylum: Arthropoda
- Class: Insecta
- Order: Coleoptera
- Suborder: Polyphaga
- Infraorder: Cucujiformia
- Family: Mordellidae
- Genus: Cothurus
- Species: C. bordoni

Binomial name
- Cothurus bordoni Franciscolo, 1987

Species of beetle

Cothurus bordoni is a species of beetle in the genus Cothurus. It was described in 1987.
