= Paratomoxioda fenestrata =

Scientific classification
- Kingdom: Animalia
- Phylum: Arthropoda
- Class: Insecta
- Order: Coleoptera
- Suborder: Polyphaga
- Infraorder: Cucujiformia
- Family: Mordellidae
- Genus: Paratomoxioda
- Species: P. fenestrata

Binomial name
- Paratomoxioda fenestrata (Franciscolo, 1965)

Species of beetle

Paratomoxioda fenestrata is a species of beetle in the genus Paratomoxioda of the family Mordellidae. It was described in 1965.
