= Sphaeromorda velutinoides =

Scientific classification
- Domain: Eukaryota
- Kingdom: Animalia
- Phylum: Arthropoda
- Class: Insecta
- Order: Coleoptera
- Suborder: Polyphaga
- Infraorder: Cucujiformia
- Family: Mordellidae
- Genus: Sphaeromorda
- Species: S. velutinoides

Binomial name
- Sphaeromorda velutinoides Franciscolo, 1965

Species of beetle

Sphaeromorda velutinoides is a species of beetle in the genus Sphaeromorda of the family Mordellidae, which is part of the superfamily Tenebrionoidea. It was described in 1965 by Franciscolo.
