= Plesitomoxia atra =

Scientific classification
- Domain: Eukaryota
- Kingdom: Animalia
- Phylum: Arthropoda
- Class: Insecta
- Order: Coleoptera
- Suborder: Polyphaga
- Infraorder: Cucujiformia
- Family: Mordellidae
- Genus: Plesitomoxia
- Species: P. atra

Binomial name
- Plesitomoxia atra Ermisch, 1962

Species of beetle

Plesitomoxia atra is a species of beetle in the genus Plesitomoxia of the family Mordellidae. It was described in 1962.
