= Mordellistenochroa =

Scientific classification
- Kingdom: Animalia
- Phylum: Arthropoda
- Class: Insecta
- Order: Coleoptera
- Suborder: Polyphaga
- Infraorder: Cucujiformia
- Family: Mordellidae
- Tribe: Mordellistenini
- Genus: Mordellistenochroa; Horák, 1982

Type species
- Mordellistenochroa strejceki Horák, 1982

Genus of beetles

Mordellistenochroa is a genus of beetles in the family Mordellidae, containing the following species:

- Mordellistenochroa fallaciosa (Ermisch, 1969)
- Mordellistenochroa strejceki Horák, 1982
