= Ophthalmoglipa aurocaudata =

Scientific classification
- Kingdom: Animalia
- Phylum: Arthropoda
- Class: Insecta
- Order: Coleoptera
- Suborder: Polyphaga
- Infraorder: Cucujiformia
- Family: Mordellidae
- Genus: Ophthalmoglipa
- Species: O. aurocaudata

Binomial name
- Ophthalmoglipa aurocaudata (Fairmaire, 1897)

Species of beetle

Ophthalmoglipa aurocaudata is a species of beetle in the genus Ophthalmoglipa of the family Mordellidae. It was described in 1897.
