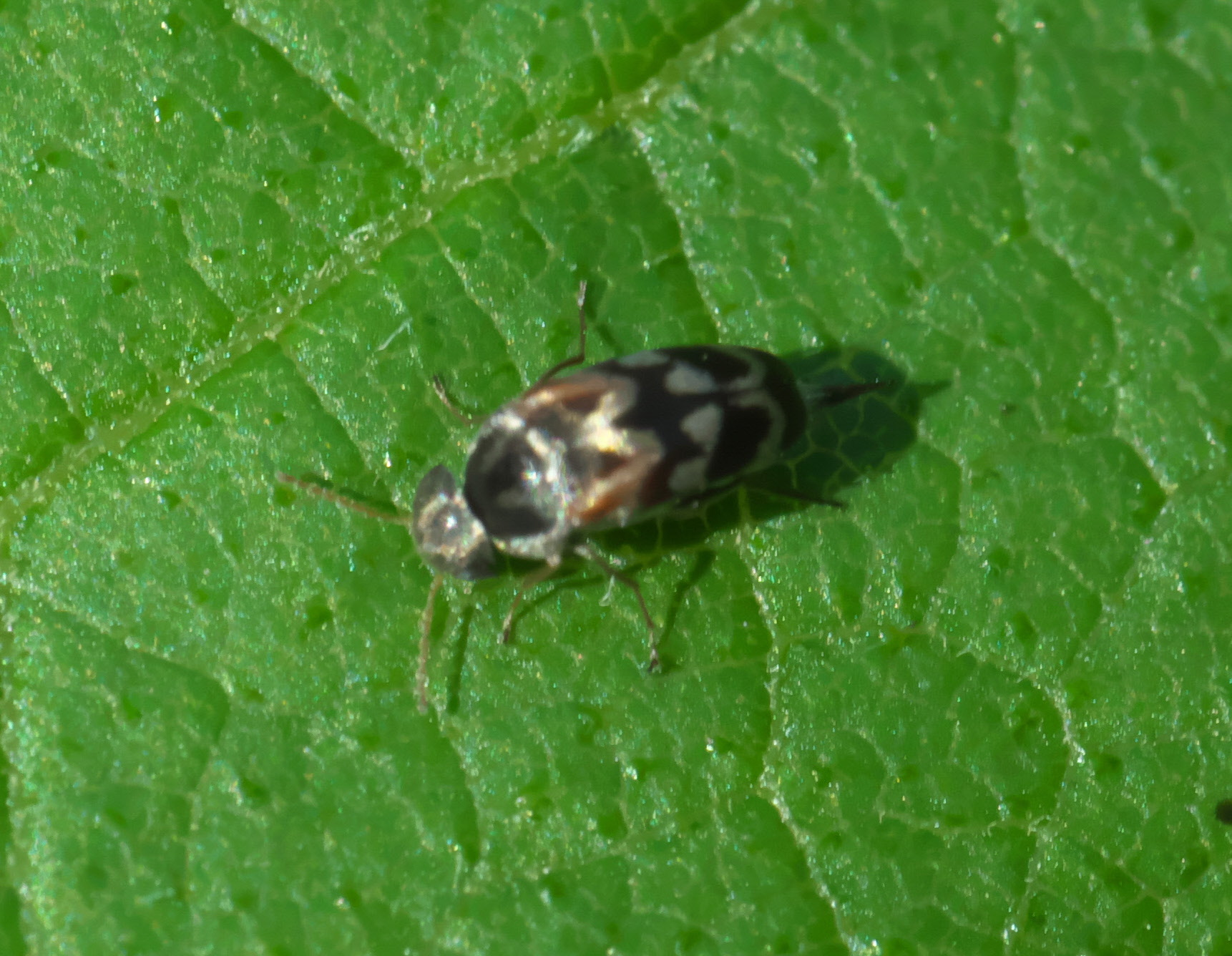
- Paramordellaria carinata

Scientific classification
- Domain: Eukaryota
- Kingdom: Animalia
- Phylum: Arthropoda
- Class: Insecta
- Order: Coleoptera
- Suborder: Polyphaga
- Infraorder: Cucujiformia
- Family: Mordellidae
- Subfamily: Mordellinae
- Tribe: Mordellini
- Genus: Paramordellaria; Ermisch, 1968

= Paramordellaria =

Genus of beetles

Paramordellaria is a genus of tumbling flower beetles in the family Mordellidae. There are at least two described species in Paramordellaria.

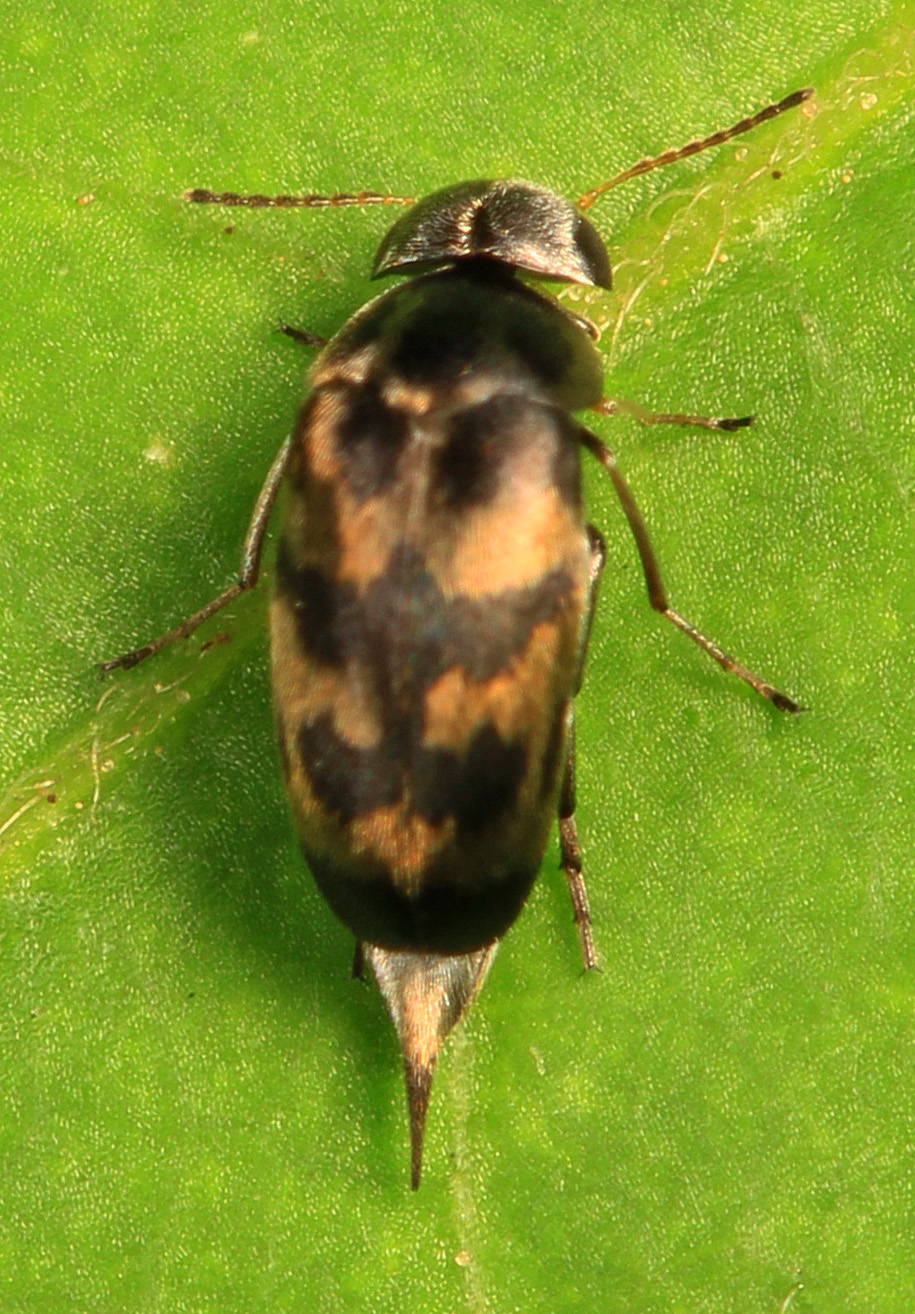
Paramordellaria triloba

== Species ==
These two species belong to the genus Paramordellaria:

- Paramordellaria carinata (Smith, 1883) (United States and Mexico)
- Paramordellaria triloba (Say, 1824) (North America)
