= Raymordella xanthosoma =

Scientific classification
- Domain: Eukaryota
- Kingdom: Animalia
- Phylum: Arthropoda
- Class: Insecta
- Order: Coleoptera
- Suborder: Polyphaga
- Infraorder: Cucujiformia
- Family: Mordellidae
- Genus: Raymordella
- Species: R. xanthosoma

Binomial name
- Raymordella xanthosoma Franciscolo, 1967

Species of beetle

Raymordella xanthosoma is a beetle in the genus Raymordella of the family Mordellidae. It was described in 1967 by Franciscolo.
