= Iberomorda =

Scientific classification
- Domain: Eukaryota
- Kingdom: Animalia
- Phylum: Arthropoda
- Class: Insecta
- Order: Coleoptera
- Suborder: Polyphaga
- Infraorder: Cucujiformia
- Family: Mordellidae
- Subfamily: Mordellinae
- Tribe: Mordellini
- Genus: Iberomorda; Mequignon, 1946

Genus of beetles

Iberomorda is a genus of tumbling flower beetles in the family Mordellidae. There are at least two described species in Iberomorda.

== Species ==
These two species belong to the genus Iberomorda:

- Iberomorda sulcicauda (Mulsant, 1856)
- Iberomorda viridipennis (Mulsant, 1856)
