= Pseudodellamora championi =

Scientific classification
- Domain: Eukaryota
- Kingdom: Animalia
- Phylum: Arthropoda
- Class: Insecta
- Order: Coleoptera
- Suborder: Polyphaga
- Infraorder: Cucujiformia
- Family: Mordellidae
- Genus: Pseudodellamora
- Species: P. championi

Binomial name
- Pseudodellamora championi (Schilsky, 1899)

Synonyms
- Mordellistena championi Schilsky, 1899

Species of beetle

Pseudodellamora championi is a beetle in the genus Pseudodellamora of the family Mordellidae. It was described in 1899 by Schilsky.
