= Stenoconalia =

Scientific classification
- Kingdom: Animalia
- Phylum: Arthropoda
- Class: Insecta
- Order: Coleoptera
- Suborder: Polyphaga
- Infraorder: Cucujiformia
- Family: Mordellidae
- Tribe: Mordellini
- Genus: Stenoconalia; Ermisch, 1967

Genus of beetles

Stenoconalia is a genus of tumbling flower beetles in the family Mordellidae. Its sole species is Stenoconalia endroedyi.

This species was deleted from the GBIF taxonomy in 2018, and its treatment is uncertain.
