= Cephaloglipa =

Scientific classification
- Domain: Eukaryota
- Kingdom: Animalia
- Phylum: Arthropoda
- Class: Insecta
- Order: Coleoptera
- Suborder: Polyphaga
- Infraorder: Cucujiformia
- Family: Mordellidae
- Subfamily: Mordellinae
- Tribe: Mordellini
- Genus: Cephaloglipa; Franciscolo, 1952
- Species: C. paumomuensis

Binomial name
- Cephaloglipa paumomuensis Franciscolo, 1952

Species of beetle

Cephaloglipa paumomuensis is a species of beetles in the family Mordellidae, the only species in the genus Cephaloglipa. It was found in New Guinea.
