= Austromordella demarzi =

Scientific classification
- Domain: Eukaryota
- Kingdom: Animalia
- Phylum: Arthropoda
- Class: Insecta
- Order: Coleoptera
- Suborder: Polyphaga
- Infraorder: Cucujiformia
- Family: Mordellidae
- Genus: Austromordella
- Species: A. demarzi

Binomial name
- Austromordella demarzi Ermisch, 1963

Species of beetle

Austromordella demarzi is a species of beetle in the genus Austromordella. It was described in 1963.
