= Wittmerimorda =

Scientific classification
- Domain: Eukaryota
- Kingdom: Animalia
- Phylum: Arthropoda
- Class: Insecta
- Order: Coleoptera
- Suborder: Polyphaga
- Infraorder: Cucujiformia
- Family: Mordellidae
- Subfamily: Mordellinae
- Tribe: Mordellini
- Genus: Wittmerimorda; Franciscolo, 1952

Genus of beetles

Wittmerimorda gymnophthalma is a species of beetle in the family Mordellidae, the only species in the genus Wittmerimorda.
