= Mordellopalpus =

Scientific classification
- Domain: Eukaryota
- Kingdom: Animalia
- Phylum: Arthropoda
- Class: Insecta
- Order: Coleoptera
- Suborder: Polyphaga
- Infraorder: Cucujiformia
- Family: Mordellidae
- Subfamily: Mordellinae
- Tribe: Mordellini
- Genus: Mordellopalpus
- Species: M. antennarius

Binomial name
- Mordellopalpus antennarius Franciscolo, 1955

Genus of beetles

Mordellopalpus is a genus of tumbling flower beetles in the family Mordellidae. It has a single species, Mordellopalpus antennarius, which was found in Indonesia.
