= Ideorhipistena =

Scientific classification
- Domain: Eukaryota
- Kingdom: Animalia
- Phylum: Arthropoda
- Class: Insecta
- Order: Coleoptera
- Suborder: Polyphaga
- Infraorder: Cucujiformia
- Family: Mordellidae
- Subfamily: Mordellinae
- Tribe: Mordellini
- Genus: Ideorhipistena; Franciscolo, 2000
- Species: I. occipitalis

Binomial name
- Ideorhipistena occipitalis Franciscolo, 2000

Genus of beetles

Ideorhipistena is a genus of tumbling flower beetles in the family Mordellidae. Ideorhipistena occipitalis is the sole species of this genus.
