= Mordellistenochroa fallaciosa =

Scientific classification
- Kingdom: Animalia
- Phylum: Arthropoda
- Class: Insecta
- Order: Coleoptera
- Suborder: Polyphaga
- Infraorder: Cucujiformia
- Family: Mordellidae
- Genus: Mordellistenochroa
- Species: M. fallaciosa

Binomial name
- Mordellistenochroa fallaciosa (Ermisch, 1969)

Synonyms
- Mordellistena fallaciosa Ermisch, 1969

Species of beetle

Mordellistenochroa fallaciosa is a beetle in the genus Mordellistenochroa of the family Mordellidae. It was described in 1969 by Ermisch.
