= Mordellapygium =

Scientific classification
- Kingdom: Animalia
- Phylum: Arthropoda
- Class: Insecta
- Order: Coleoptera
- Suborder: Polyphaga
- Infraorder: Cucujiformia
- Family: Mordellidae
- Subfamily: Mordellinae
- Tribe: Mordellini
- Genus: Mordellapygium; Ray, 1930

Genus of beetles

Mordellapygium is a genus of tumbling flower beetles in the family Mordellidae.

== Species ==
These species belong to the genus Mordellapygium.

- Mordellapygium elongatum Ray, 1930
- Mordellapygium philippinensis Ray, 1930
