= Tolidopalpus galloisi =

Scientific classification
- Domain: Eukaryota
- Kingdom: Animalia
- Phylum: Arthropoda
- Class: Insecta
- Order: Coleoptera
- Suborder: Polyphaga
- Infraorder: Cucujiformia
- Family: Mordellidae
- Genus: Tolidopalpus
- Species: T. galloisi

Binomial name
- Tolidopalpus galloisi (Kôno, 1932)

Synonyms
- Mordellistena galloisi Kôno, 1932

Species of beetle

Tolidopalpus galloisi is a beetle in the genus Tolidopalpus of the family Mordellidae. It was described in 1932 by Kôno.
