= Mordellistenochroa strejceki =

Scientific classification
- Kingdom: Animalia
- Phylum: Arthropoda
- Class: Insecta
- Order: Coleoptera
- Suborder: Polyphaga
- Infraorder: Cucujiformia
- Family: Mordellidae
- Genus: Mordellistenochroa
- Species: M. strejceki

Binomial name
- Mordellistenochroa strejceki Horák, 1982

Species of beetle

Mordellistenochroa strejceki is a beetle in the genus Mordellistenochroa of the family Mordellidae. It was described in 1982 by Horák.
