= Xanthomorda =

Scientific classification
- Domain: Eukaryota
- Kingdom: Animalia
- Phylum: Arthropoda
- Class: Insecta
- Order: Coleoptera
- Suborder: Polyphaga
- Infraorder: Cucujiformia
- Family: Mordellidae
- Subfamily: Mordellinae
- Tribe: Mordellistenini
- Genus: Xanthomorda; Ermisch, 1968

Genus of beetles

Xanthomorda is a genus of tumbling flower beetles in the family Mordellidae, found in Papua New Guinea.

== Species ==
The following species are members of the genus Xanthomorda.

- Xanthomorda aequalis Batten, 1990
- Xanthomorda cooteri Batten, 1990
- Xanthomorda elegantissima Batten, 1990
- Xanthomorda paarlbergi Batten, 1990
- Xanthomorda papuanica Batten, 1990
- Xanthomorda plazae Batten, 1990
