= Paratomoxioda evanescens =

Scientific classification
- Kingdom: Animalia
- Phylum: Arthropoda
- Class: Insecta
- Order: Coleoptera
- Suborder: Polyphaga
- Infraorder: Cucujiformia
- Family: Mordellidae
- Genus: Paratomoxioda
- Species: P. evanescens

Binomial name
- Paratomoxioda evanescens (Normand, 1949)

Synonyms
- Mordella evanescens Normand, 1949

Species of beetle

Paratomoxioda evanescens is a species of tumbling flower beetle in the family Mordellidae.
