= Succimorda =

Scientific classification
- Domain: Eukaryota
- Kingdom: Animalia
- Phylum: Arthropoda
- Class: Insecta
- Order: Coleoptera
- Suborder: Polyphaga
- Infraorder: Cucujiformia
- Family: Mordellidae
- Subfamily: Mordellinae
- Tribe: Mordellini
- Genus: †Succimorda; Kubisz, 2001
- Species: †S. rubromaculata

Binomial name
- †Succimorda rubromaculata Kubisz, 2001

Genus of beetles

Succimorda is a fossil genus of tumbling flower beetles in the family Mordellidae. This genus has a single extinct species, Succimorda rubromaculata.
