= Asiatolida =

Scientific classification
- Domain: Eukaryota
- Kingdom: Animalia
- Phylum: Arthropoda
- Class: Insecta
- Order: Coleoptera
- Suborder: Polyphaga
- Infraorder: Cucujiformia
- Family: Mordellidae
- Tribe: Mordellistenini
- Genus: Asiatolida; Shiyake, 2000
- Species: A. Asiatolida

Binomial name
- Asiatolida Asiatolida Shiyake, 2000

Genus of beetles

Asiatolida is a genus of beetles in the family Mordellidae, consisting of Asiatolida miyatakei.

When Shiyake first described this genus, he also included Asiatolida melana (Fan & Yang, 1995).
