= Cothurus =

Scientific classification
- Kingdom: Animalia
- Phylum: Arthropoda
- Class: Insecta
- Order: Coleoptera
- Suborder: Polyphaga
- Infraorder: Cucujiformia
- Family: Mordellidae
- Subfamily: Mordellinae
- Tribe: Mordellini
- Genus: Cothurus; Champion, 1891

Genus of beetles

Cothurus is a genus of tumbling flower beetles in the family Mordellidae. There are about seven described species in Cothurus.

== Species ==
These seven species belong to the genus Cothurus:

- Cothurus bordoni Franciscolo, 1987
- Cothurus brulei Leblanc, 2013
- Cothurus constantini Leblanc, 2013
- Cothurus dalensi Leblanc, 2013
- Cothurus fernandezi Leblanc, 2013
- Cothurus poirieri Leblanc, 2013
- Cothurus touroulti Leblanc, 2013
