= Reynoldsiellini =

Scientific classification
- Domain: Eukaryota
- Kingdom: Animalia
- Phylum: Arthropoda
- Class: Insecta
- Order: Coleoptera
- Suborder: Polyphaga
- Infraorder: Cucujiformia
- Family: Mordellidae
- Subfamily: Mordellinae
- Tribe: Reynoldsiellini; Franciscolo, 1957

Tribe of beetles

The Reynoldsiellini are a tribe of tumbling flower beetles in the family Mordellidae. Reynoldsiella contains a single living species, parallela, known from Venezuela. Primaevomordellida is an extinct genus discovered in Myanmar, in amber.

== Genera ==
- Reynoldsiella Ray, 1930
- † Primaevomordellida Bao et al., 2018
