= Pselaphokentron =

Scientific classification
- Domain: Eukaryota
- Kingdom: Animalia
- Phylum: Arthropoda
- Class: Insecta
- Order: Coleoptera
- Suborder: Polyphaga
- Infraorder: Cucujiformia
- Family: Mordellidae
- Subfamily: Mordellinae
- Genus: Pselaphokentron; Franciscolo, 1955
- Species: P. aculeatum

Binomial name
- Pselaphokentron aculeatum Franciscolo, 1990

Genus of beetles

Paramordellistena is a genus of tumbling flower beetles in the family Mordellidae. There is at least one species in this genus, Pselaphokentron aculeatum. It is endemic to Sierra Leone
