= Larinomorda =

Scientific classification
- Kingdom: Animalia
- Phylum: Arthropoda
- Class: Insecta
- Order: Coleoptera
- Suborder: Polyphaga
- Infraorder: Cucujiformia
- Family: Mordellidae
- Genus: Larinomorda; Ermisch, 1968
- Species: L. ivoirensis

Binomial name
- Larinomorda ivoirensis Ermisch, 1968

Species of beetle

Larinomorda ivoirensis is a species of beetle in the family Mordellidae, the only species in the genus Larinomorda.
