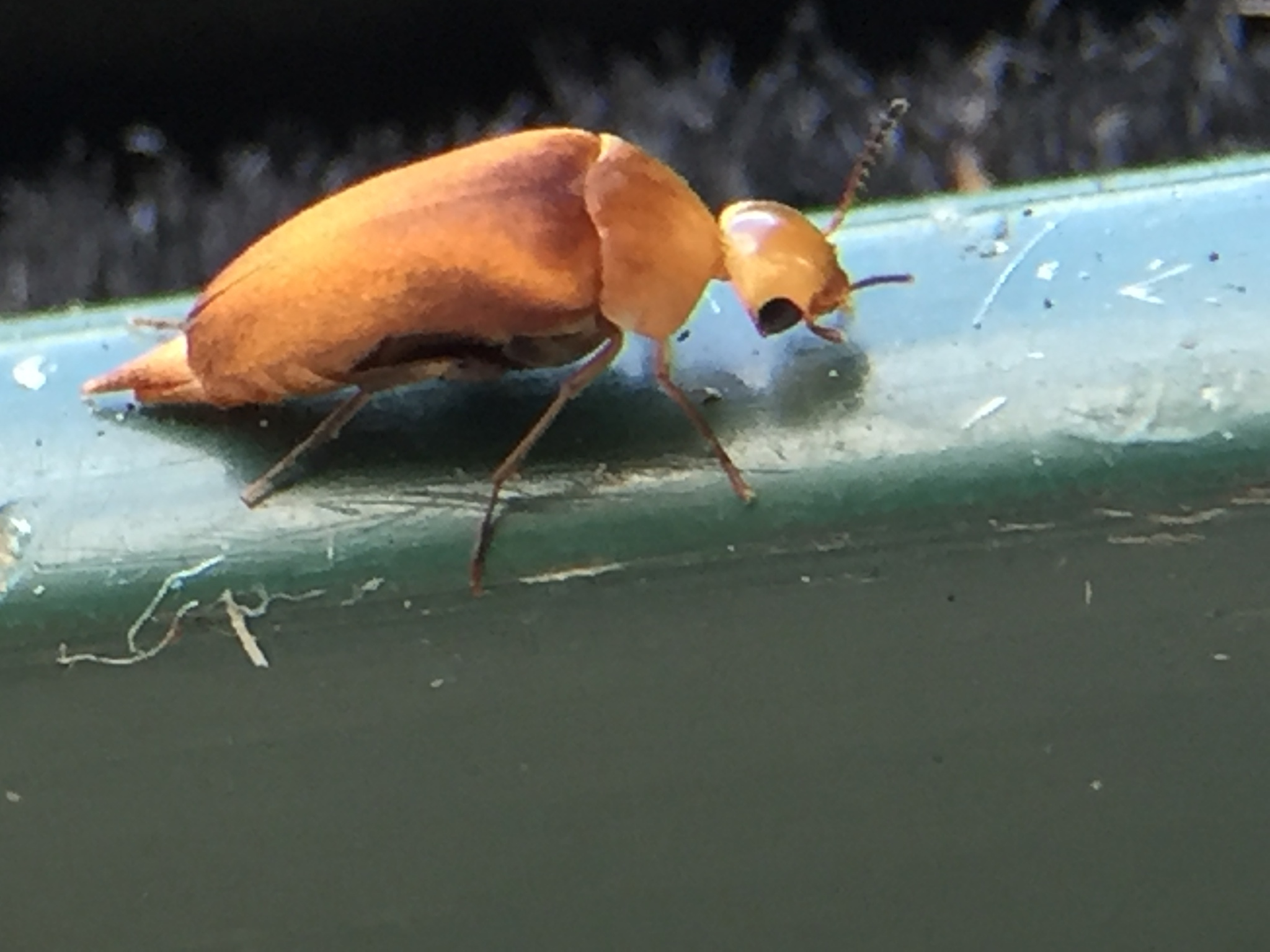
- Tolidopalpus nitidicoma, New Zealand

Scientific classification
- Kingdom: Animalia
- Phylum: Arthropoda
- Class: Insecta
- Order: Coleoptera
- Suborder: Polyphaga
- Infraorder: Cucujiformia
- Family: Mordellidae
- Subfamily: Mordellinae
- Tribe: Mordellistenini
- Genus: Tolidopalpus; Ermisch, 1952

= Tolidopalpus =

Genus of beetles

Tolidopalpus is a genus of tumbling flower beetles in the family Mordellidae. There are about six described species in Tolidopalpus.

== Species ==
These species belong to the genus Tolidopalpus:

- Tolidopalpus bimaculatus Shiyake, 1997 (Philippines)
- Tolidopalpus castaneicolor Ermisch, 1952 (China)
- Tolidopalpus dohertyi (Pic, 1917) (southeast Asia)
- Tolidopalpus galloisi (Kono, 1932) (temperate Asia)
- Tolidopalpus nitidocoma (Lea 1929) (New Zealand)
- Tolidopalpus sakaii Shiyake, 1997 (Philippines)
