= Falsomordellina =

Scientific classification
- Kingdom: Animalia
- Phylum: Arthropoda
- Class: Insecta
- Order: Coleoptera
- Suborder: Polyphaga
- Infraorder: Cucujiformia
- Family: Mordellidae
- Subfamily: Mordellinae
- Tribe: Mordellistenini
- Genus: Falsomordellina; Nomura, 1966

Genus of beetles

Falsomordellina is a genus of tumbling flower beetles in the family Mordellidae. There are at least four described species in Falsomordellina.

== Species ==
These species belong to the genus Falsomordellina:

- Falsomordellina amamiana (Nomura, 1961)
- Falsomordellina luteoloides (Nomura, 1961)
- Falsomordellina makiharai Tsuru, 2021
- Falsomordellina takaosana (Kôno, 1935)
