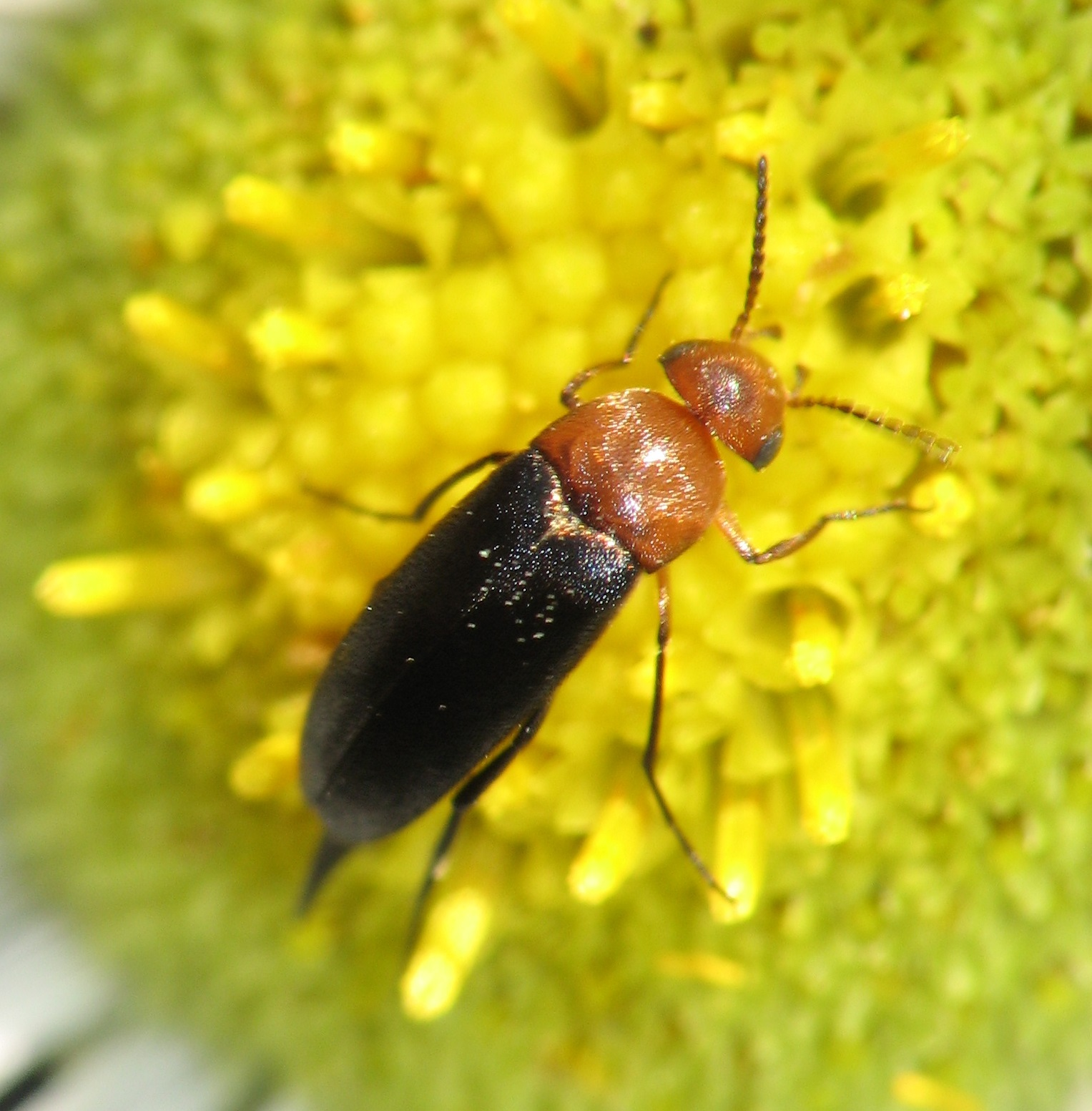

Scientific classification
- Domain: Eukaryota
- Kingdom: Animalia
- Phylum: Arthropoda
- Class: Insecta
- Order: Coleoptera
- Suborder: Polyphaga
- Infraorder: Cucujiformia
- Family: Mordellidae
- Genus: Mordellistena
- Species: M. cervicalis

Binomial name
- Mordellistena cervicalis LeConte, 1862

= Mordellistena cervicalis =

Species of beetle

Mordellistena cervicalis is a beetle in the genus Mordellistena of the family Mordellidae. It was described in 1862 by John Lawrence LeConte.

It is found in North America in the east.
