= Paratomoxioda =

Scientific classification
- Kingdom: Animalia
- Phylum: Arthropoda
- Class: Insecta
- Order: Coleoptera
- Suborder: Polyphaga
- Infraorder: Cucujiformia
- Family: Mordellidae
- Subfamily: Mordellinae
- Tribe: Mordellini
- Genus: Paratomoxioda; Ermisch, 1954

Genus of beetles

Paratomoxioda is a genus of tumbling flower beetles in the family Mordellidae. There are at least 11 described species in Paratomoxioda.

== Species ==
These 11 species belong to the genus Paratomoxioda:

- Paratomoxioda bioculata Franciscolo, 1965
- Paratomoxioda brevis Franciscolo, 1965
- Paratomoxioda capensis Franciscolo, 1965
- Paratomoxioda curvipalpis (Stshegoleva-Barovskaya, 1930)
- Paratomoxioda evanescens (Normand, 1949)
- Paratomoxioda fenestrata Franciscolo, 1965
- Paratomoxioda grandipalpis Franciscolo, 1965
- Paratomoxioda harteni (Horak, 2009)
- Paratomoxioda novemguttata Franciscolo, 1965
- Paratomoxioda testaceipalpis Franciscolo, 1965
- Paratomoxioda uncinata Franciscolo, 1965
