= Raymordella transversalis =

Scientific classification
- Domain: Eukaryota
- Kingdom: Animalia
- Phylum: Arthropoda
- Class: Insecta
- Order: Coleoptera
- Suborder: Polyphaga
- Infraorder: Cucujiformia
- Family: Mordellidae
- Genus: Raymordella
- Species: R. transversalis

Binomial name
- Raymordella transversalis Franciscolo, 1967

Species of beetle

Raymordella transversalis is a beetle in the genus Raymordella of the family Mordellidae. It was described in 1967 by Franciscolo.
