= Raymordella =

Scientific classification
- Domain: Eukaryota
- Kingdom: Animalia
- Phylum: Arthropoda
- Class: Insecta
- Order: Coleoptera
- Suborder: Polyphaga
- Infraorder: Cucujiformia
- Family: Mordellidae
- Subfamily: Mordellinae
- Tribe: Mordellistenini
- Genus: Raymordella; Franciscolo, 1956

Synonyms
- Raymordellina Franciscolo, 1967

Genus of beetles

Raymordella is a genus of beetles in the family Mordellidae, containing the following species:

- Raymordella adusta Franciscolo, 1967
- Raymordella ambigua Franciscolo, 1956
- Raymordella transversalis Franciscolo, 1967
- Raymordella xanthosoma Franciscolo, 1967
