= Raymordella ambigua =

Scientific classification
- Domain: Eukaryota
- Kingdom: Animalia
- Phylum: Arthropoda
- Class: Insecta
- Order: Coleoptera
- Suborder: Polyphaga
- Infraorder: Cucujiformia
- Family: Mordellidae
- Genus: Raymordella
- Species: R. ambigua

Binomial name
- Raymordella ambigua Franciscolo, 1956

Species of beetle

Raymordella ambigua is a beetle in the genus Raymordella of the family Mordellidae. It was described in 1956 by Franciscolo.
