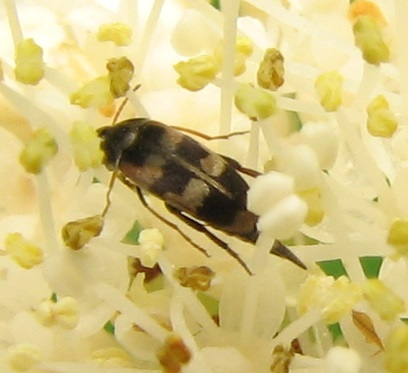
- Falsomordellistena pubescens

Scientific classification
- Domain: Eukaryota
- Kingdom: Animalia
- Phylum: Arthropoda
- Class: Insecta
- Order: Coleoptera
- Suborder: Polyphaga
- Infraorder: Cucujiformia
- Family: Mordellidae
- Tribe: Mordellistenini
- Genus: Falsomordellistena; Ermisch, 1941

= Falsomordellistena =

Genus of beetles

Falsomordellistena is a genus of tumbling flower beetles in the family Mordellidae, containing the following species:

- Falsomordellistena alpigena Tokeji, 1953
- Falsomordellistena altestrigata (Marseul, 1876)
- Falsomordellistena auriguttata Nomura, 1951
- Falsomordellistena aurofasciata (Nakane, 1949)
- Falsomordellistena aurosuturalis Nomura, 1967^{g}
- Falsomordellistena awana Kôno
- Falsomordellistena ayahime Nomura, 1967
- Falsomordellistena baishanzuna Fan, 1995
- Falsomordellistena bihamata (Melsheimer, 1845)^{i c g b}
- Falsomordellistena brasiliensis Ermisch, 1950
- Falsomordellistena bruneiensis Chûjô, 1964
- Falsomordellistena discolor (Melsheimer, 1845)^{i c g b}
- Falsomordellistena eocenica Kubisz, 2003
- Falsomordellistena formosana (Píc, 1911)
- Falsomordellistena hebraica (LeConte, 1862)^{i c g b}
- Falsomordellistena hiranoi^{g}
- Falsomordellistena hirasana Shiyake, 1996
- Falsomordellistena humerosignata Nomura, 1967
- Falsomordellistena inouei Nomura, 1951
- Falsomordellistena kleckai Horak, 2005^{g}
- Falsomordellistena konoi^{g}
- Falsomordellistena loochooana Nomura, 1964
- Falsomordellistena nipponica Nomura, 1957
- Falsomordellistena parca Tokeji, 1953
- Falsomordellistena pseudalpigena Nomura, 1975
- Falsomordellistena pubescens (Fabricius, 1798)^{i c g b}
- Falsomordellistena rosseolloides Nomura, 1975
- Falsomordellistena sauteri (Píc, 1926)
- Falsomordellistena shinanomensis Tokeji, 1953
- Falsomordellistena shirozui Chûjô, 1957
- Falsomordellistena tokarana Nakane, 1956
- Falsomordellistena vagevittata Nakane, 1957
- Falsomordellistena watanabei Nomura, 1975
- Falsomordellistena wui Fan & Yang, 1995

Data sources: i = ITIS, c = Catalogue of Life, g = GBIF, b = Bugguide.net
