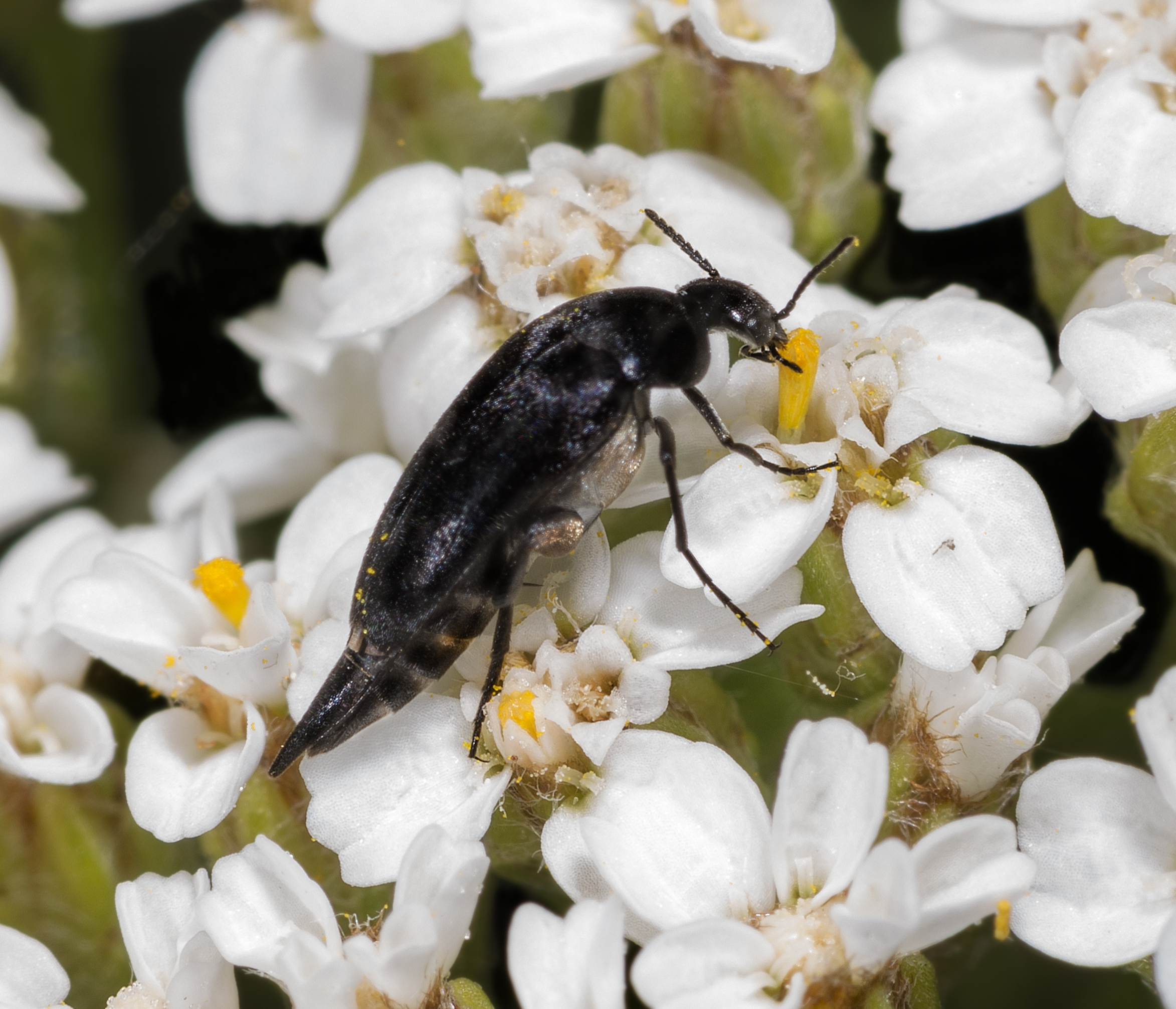
- Mordella aculeata; note the "pintail"

Scientific classification
- Kingdom: Animalia
- Phylum: Arthropoda
- Clade: Pancrustacea
- Class: Insecta
- Order: Coleoptera
- Suborder: Polyphaga
- Infraorder: Cucujiformia
- Family: Mordellidae
- Subfamily: Mordellinae; Latreille, 1802

= Mordellinae =

Subfamily of beetles

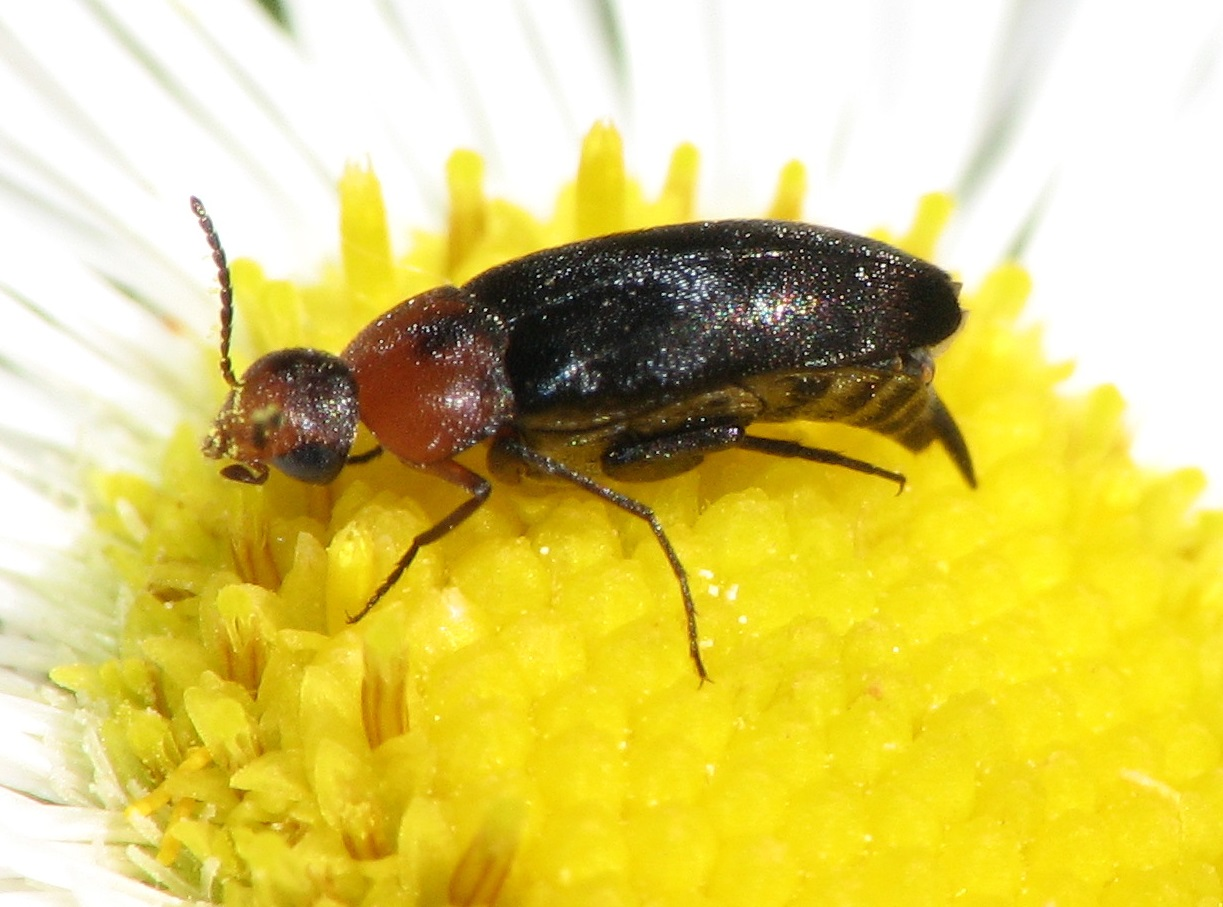
Mordellistena cervicalis.

Mordellinae is a subfamily of beetles commonly known as tumbling flower beetles for the typical irregular movements they make when escaping predators, or as pintail beetles due to their abdominal tip which aids them in performing these tumbling movements.

== Tribes and genera ==
- Tribe Conaliini Ermisch, 1956
  - Conalia Mulsant & Rey, 1858
  - Conaliamorpha Ermisch, 1968
  - Glipodes LeConte, 1862
  - Isotrilophus Liljeblad, 1945
  - Paraconalia Ermisch, 1968
  - Stenoconalia Ermisch, 1967
- Tribe Mordellini Siedlitz, 1875
  - Austromordella Ermisch, 1950
  - Boatia Franciscolo, 1985
  - Calycina Blair, 1922
  - Cephaloglipa Franciscolo, 1952
  - Congomorda Ermisch, 1955
  - Cothurus Champion, 1891
  - Cretanaspis Huang & Yang, 1999
  - Curtimorda Méquignon, 1946
  - Glipa LeConte, 1859
  - Glipidiomorpha Franciscolo, 1952
  - Hoshihananomia Kônô, 1935
  - Iberomorda Méquignon, 1946
  - Ideorhipistena Franciscolo, 2000
  - Klapperichimorda Ermisch, 1968
  - Larinomorda Ermisch, 1968
  - Liaoximordella Wang, 1993
  - Macrotomoxia Píc, 1922
  - Mordella Linnaeus, 1758
  - Mordellapygium Ray, 1930
  - Mordellaria Ermisch, 1950
  - Mordelloides Ray, 1939
  - Mordellopalpus Franciscolo, 1955
  - Neocurtimorda Franciscolo, 1950
  - Ophthalmoglipa Franciscolo, 1952
  - Paramordellaria Ermisch, 1968
  - Paraphungia Ermisch, 1969
  - Paratomoxioda Ermisch, 1954
  - Phungia Píc, 1922
  - Plesitomoxia Ermisch, 1955
  - Praemordella Shchegoleva-Barovskaya, 1929
  - Sphaeromorda Franciscolo, 1950
  - Stenomordella Ermisch, 1941
  - Stenomordellaria Ermisch, 1950
  - Succimorda Kubisz, 2001
  - Tolidomordella Ermisch, 1950
  - Tomoxia Costa, 1854
  - Tomoxioda Ermisch, 1950
  - Trichotomoxia Franciscolo, 1950
  - Variimorda Méquignon, 1946
  - Wittmerimorda Franciscolo, 1952
  - Yakuhananomia Kônô, 1935
  - Zeamordella Broun, 1886
- Tribe Mordellistenini Ermisch, 1941
  - Asiatolida Shiyake, 2000
  - Calyce Champion, 1891
  - Calycemorda Ermisch, 1969
  - Dellamora Normand, 1916
  - Ermischiella Franciscolo, 1950
  - Fahraeusiella Ermisch, 1953
  - Falsomordellina Nomura, 1966
  - Falsomordellistena Ermisch, 1941
  - Glipostena Ermisch, 1941
  - Glipostenoda Ermisch, 1950
  - Jenisia Horák, 2008
  - Mordellina Schilsky, 1908
  - Mordellistena Costa, 1854
  - Mordellistenochroa Horák, 1982
  - Mordellistenoda Ermisch, 1941
  - Mordellistenula Stchegoleva-Barowskaja, 1930
  - Mordellochroa Emery, 1876
  - Paramordellistena Ermisch, 1950
  - Pselaphokentron Franciscolo, 1955
  - Pseudodellamora Ermisch, 1942
  - Pseudotolida Ermisch, 1950
  - Raymordella Franciscolo, 1956
  - Rolcikomorda Horák, 2008
  - Tolida Mulsant, 1856
  - Tolidopalpus Ermisch, 1951
  - Tolidostena Ermisch, 1942
  - Xanthomorda Ermisch, 1968
- Tribe Reynoldsiellini Franciscolo, 1957
  - Reynoldsiella Ray, 1930
  - †Primaevomordellida Bao et al., 2018
- Tribe Stenaliini Franciscolo, 1956
  - Brodskyella Horák, 1989
  - Pselaphostena Franciscolo, 1950
  - Stenalia Mulsant, 1856
  - Stenaliodes Franciscolo, 1956
- Tribe †Mediumiugini Peris & Ruzzier, 2013
  - †Mediumiuga Peris & Ruzzier, 2013
- unassigned genera
  - †Angimordella Bao et al., 2019
  - †Mirimordella Liu, Lu & Ren, 2007
