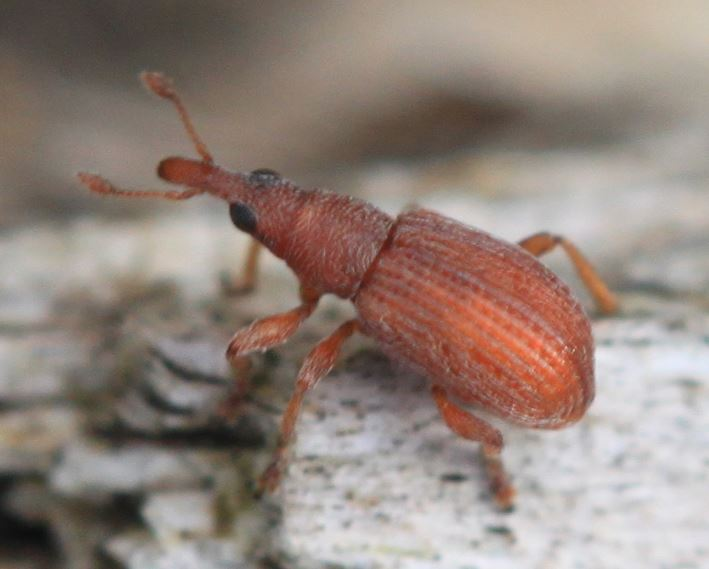
- Apion

Scientific classification
- Domain: Eukaryota
- Kingdom: Animalia
- Phylum: Arthropoda
- Class: Insecta
- Order: Coleoptera
- Suborder: Polyphaga
- Infraorder: Cucujiformia
- Family: Brentidae
- Subfamily: Apioninae; Schoenherr, 1823

= Apioninae =

Subfamily of beetles

Apioninae is a subfamily of pear-shaped weevils in the family of beetles known as Brentidae. There are at least 20 genera and 80 described species in Apioninae. They feed on living vegetation and sometimes on galls, making them occasional pests or tools of biological control.

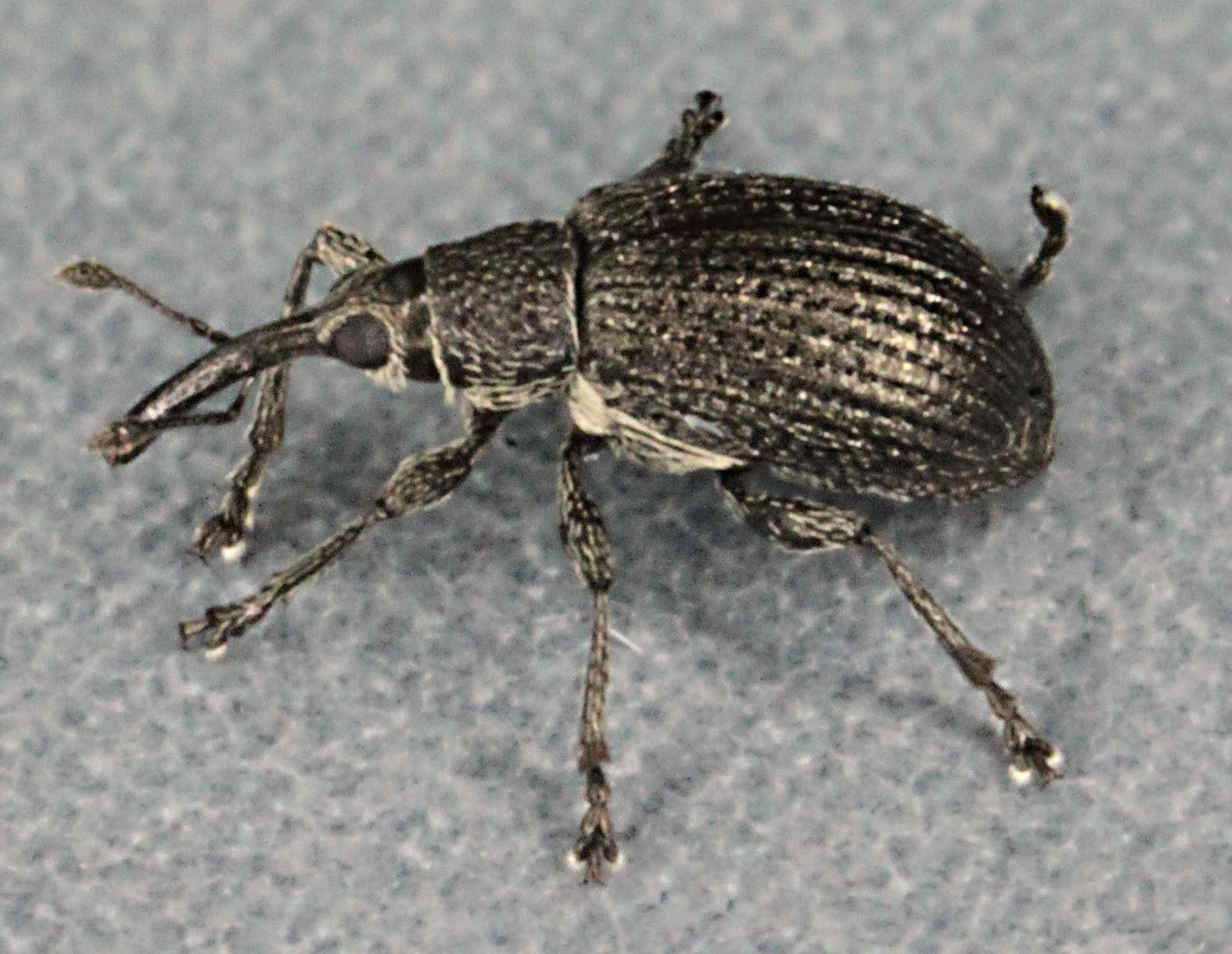
Betulapion simile

== Genera ==
These 22 genera belong to the subfamily Apioninae:

- Alocentron Schilsky in Kuester, 1901^{g b}
- Apion Herbst, 1797^{i b}
- Apionion Kissinger, 1998^{g b}
- Aspidapion^{g b}
- Betulapion Ehret, 1994^{g b}
- Chrysapion Kissinger, 1968^{b}
- Coelocephalapion Wagner, 1914^{g b}
- Eutrichapion Reitter, 1916^{g b}
- Exapion Bedel, 1887^{i g b}
- Fallapion Kissinger, 1968^{g b}
- Ischnopterapion^{g b}
- Kissingeria Alonso-Zarazaga, 1991^{g b}
- Loborhynchapion Gyorffy, 1956^{g b}
- Metapion Schilsky, 1906
- Neapion Alonso-Zarazaga, 1991^{g b}
- Neotropion^{b}
- Omphalapion Schilsky, 1901^{g b}
- Perapion Wagner, 1907^{i g b}
- Podapion Riley, 1883^{g b}
- Rhopalapion Schilsky, 1906^{g b}
- Sayapion Kissinger, 1999^{g b}
- Stenopterapion Bokor, 1923^{g b}
- Trichapion Wagner, 1912^{g b}

Data sources: i = ITIS, c = Catalogue of Life, g = GBIF, b = Bugguide.net
