= Protapion =

Scientific classification
- Domain: Eukaryota
- Kingdom: Animalia
- Phylum: Arthropoda
- Class: Insecta
- Order: Coleoptera
- Suborder: Polyphaga
- Infraorder: Cucujiformia
- Family: Brentidae
- Genus: Protapion; Schilsky, 1908

Genus of beetles

Protapion is a genus of beetles belonging to the family Apionidae.

The species of this genus are found in Europe and Africa.

Species:

- Protapion angusticolle (Gyllenhal, 1833)
- Protapion apricans (Herbst, 1797)
