= Mordellistena austriaca =

Scientific classification
- Domain: Eukaryota
- Kingdom: Animalia
- Phylum: Arthropoda
- Class: Insecta
- Order: Coleoptera
- Suborder: Polyphaga
- Infraorder: Cucujiformia
- Family: Mordellidae
- Genus: Mordellistena
- Species: M. austriaca

Binomial name
- Mordellistena austriaca Schilsky, 1898

Synonyms
- Mordellistena aureolopilosa Scegoleva-Barovskaja, 1932; Mordellistena micantoides Ermisch, 1954

Species of beetle

Mordellistena austriaca is a species of beetle in the genus Mordellistena of the family Mordellidae. It was described in 1898 and can be found in Albania, Austria, Bosnia and Herzegovina, Croatia, Czech Republic, France, Germany, Greece, Hungary, Italy, Poland, Romania, Slovakia, and Switzerland.
