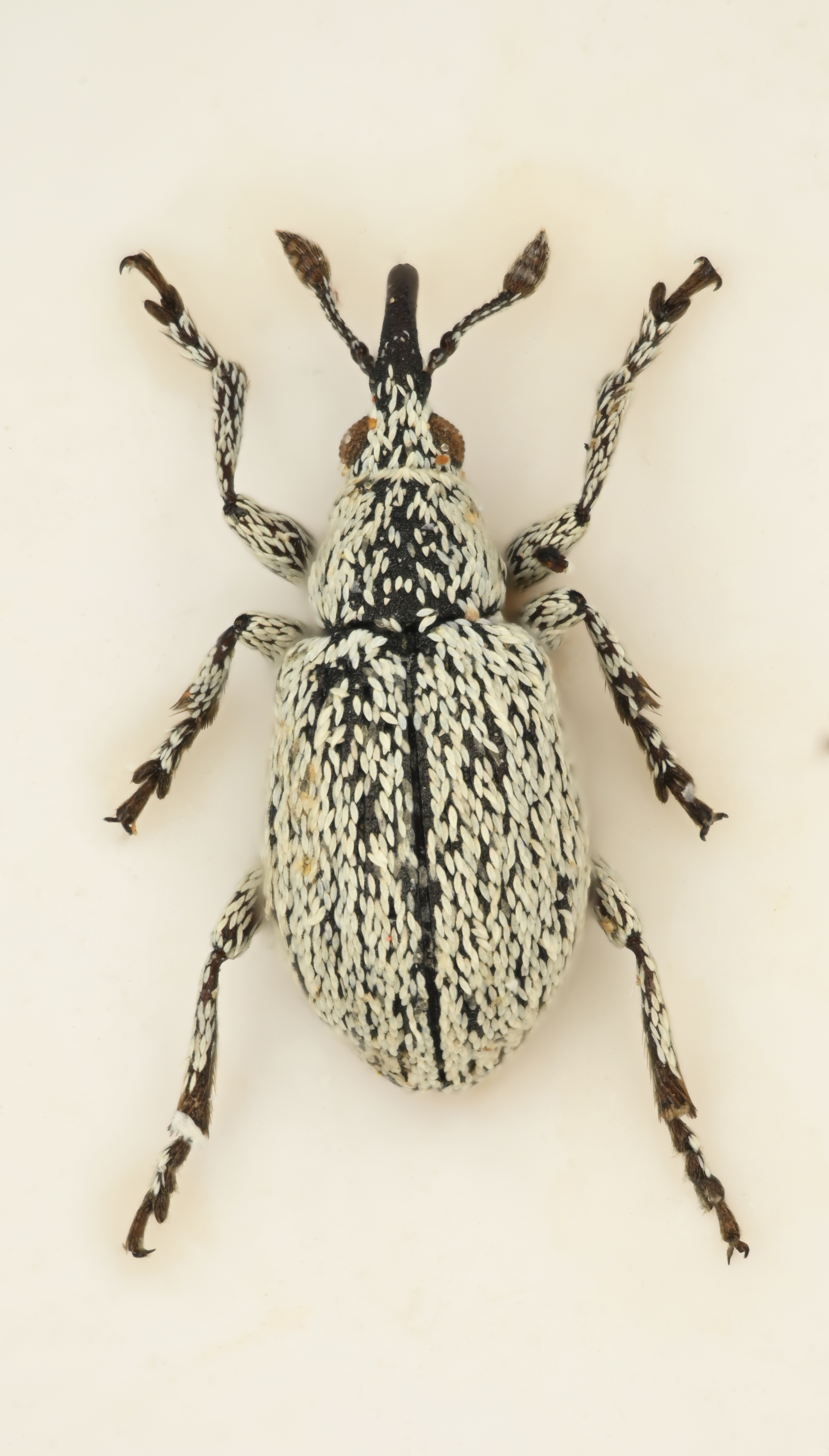
- Metapion squamosum, Libya

Scientific classification
- Domain: Eukaryota
- Kingdom: Animalia
- Phylum: Arthropoda
- Class: Insecta
- Order: Coleoptera
- Suborder: Polyphaga
- Infraorder: Cucujiformia
- Family: Brentidae
- Genus: Metapion; Schilsky, 1906

Species
- See text.

= Metapion =

Metapion Temporal range: Paleogene–Recent

Genus of insects

Metapion is a genus of beetles belonging to the family Brentidae. The species of this genus are distributed only in the Palearctic zone and likely originate from deserts of Central Asia. They are commonly found in Southern Europe, northern parts of the Middle East, Caucasus and in Central Asia. Some species also appear in northern zones of Africa (south to Sudan).

Species of this genus appear to be associated with plants in the family Rutaceae, particularly the genera Ruta and Haplophyllum. The larvae are believed to develop by mining the roots, necks, and stems of these plants.

== Description ==
Body black, covered with oval, lance-shaped or fine, hair-like scales. The proboscis has a broadening that is either sharply pointed or bluntly angled.

== Species ==
Currently, at least 20 species of Metapion are described (though not all of them are well documented):

- Metapion candidum (Wencker, 1864)
  - Metapion candidum candidum (Wencker, 1864) - Southern France, Spain, Italy, Portugal, Switzerland
  - Metapion candidum rutae (Ehret, 1997d) - Southern France, Egypt, Tunisia
- Metapion causticum (Faust, 1885) - Central Asia, Afghanistan
- Metapion cylindronotum (Ter-Minasian, 1972) - Mongolia
- Metapion densesquamatum (Pic, 1908) - Egypt
- Metapion emmrichi (Bajtenov, 1981) - Kazakhstan
- Metapion ermischi (Voss, 1969) - Austria, Bulgaria, Greece, Macedonia, Romania, Ukraine, Turkey
- Metapion gaudiale (Faust, 1885) - Central Asia, Afghanistan, Iran, Caucasus
- Metapion gelidum (Faust, 1885) - Central Asia, Afghanistan, Armenia, Iran, Syria (and possibly Russia, near Mongolia border)
- Metapion hartmanni (Desbrochers, 1897) - Southern Spain
- Metapion kysilkumicum (Bajtenov, 1979) - Uzbekistan
- Metapion lepidopterum (Wagner, 1912) - Afghanistan, Iran, Turkmenistan
- Metapion merale (Faust, 1885) - Central Asia, Afghanistan, Armenia, Iran
- Metapion nasreddinovi (Korotyaev, 1988) - Tajikistan, Uzbekistan
- Metapion normandi (Desbrochers, 1899) - Libya, Tunisia, Israel, Turkey
- Metapion obtectum (Schilsky, 1902) - Kyrgyzstan, Kazakhstan, Uzbekistan
- Metapion oculare (Gyllenhal, 1833) - Albania, Bulgaria, Macedonia, Romania, Serbia, Ukraine, Armenia, Georgia, Turkey (and possibly Austria, based on records of Apion breiti before it was synonimised with M. oculare)
- Metapion sojunovii (Bajtenov & Sojunov, 1990) - Turkmenistan
- Metapion squamosum (Faust, 1884) - Azerbaijan, Armenia, Georgia, Kazakhstan, Libya, Tajikistan, Turkmenistan, Uzbekistan
- Metapion squarrosum (Normand, 1937) - Tunisia
- Metapion subcandidum (Schilsky, 1906) - Spain

== History ==
In 1906, Schilsky separated a subgenus Metapion from previously heterogenous genus Apion. Metapion was then elevated to a genus by Korotyaev (1988) and fully established in 1991.
