= Mordellistena luteipalpis =

Scientific classification
- Domain: Eukaryota
- Kingdom: Animalia
- Phylum: Arthropoda
- Class: Insecta
- Order: Coleoptera
- Suborder: Polyphaga
- Infraorder: Cucujiformia
- Family: Mordellidae
- Genus: Mordellistena
- Species: M. luteipalpis

Binomial name
- Mordellistena luteipalpis Schilsky, 1895

Species of beetle

Mordellistena luteipalpis is a beetle in the genus Mordellistena of the family Mordellidae. It was described in 1895 by Friedrich Julius Schilsky.
