= Oxystoma =

Scientific classification
- Domain: Eukaryota
- Kingdom: Animalia
- Phylum: Arthropoda
- Class: Insecta
- Order: Coleoptera
- Suborder: Polyphaga
- Infraorder: Cucujiformia
- Family: Brentidae
- Genus: Oxystoma; Duméril, 1805

Genus of beetles

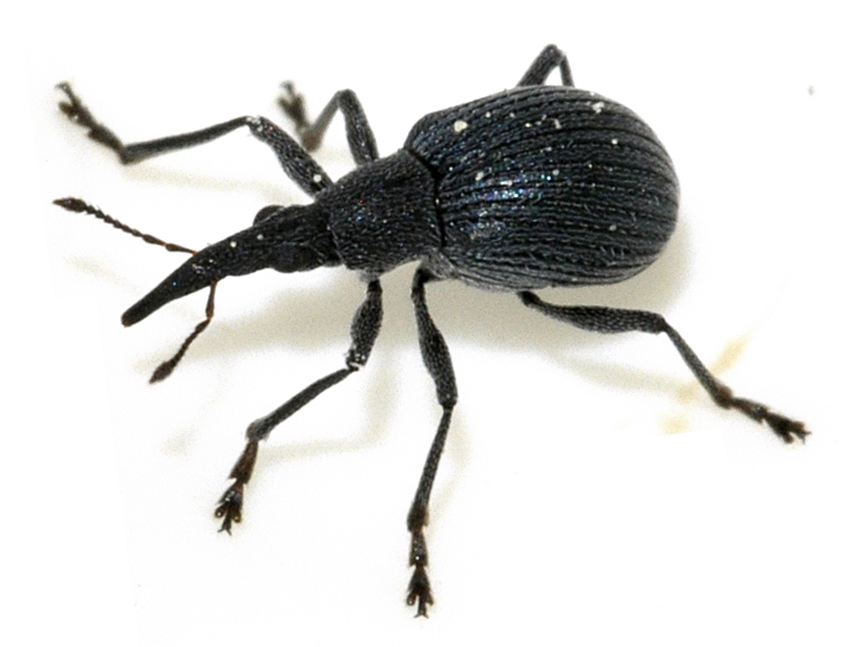
Oxystoma ochropus

Oxystoma is a genus of beetles belonging to the family Apionidae.

Species:

- Oxystoma bipartirostre
- Oxystoma cerdo
- Oxystoma craccae
- Oxystoma dimidiatum
- Oxystoma ochropus
- Oxystoma opeticum
- Oxystoma pomonae
- Oxystoma subulatum
