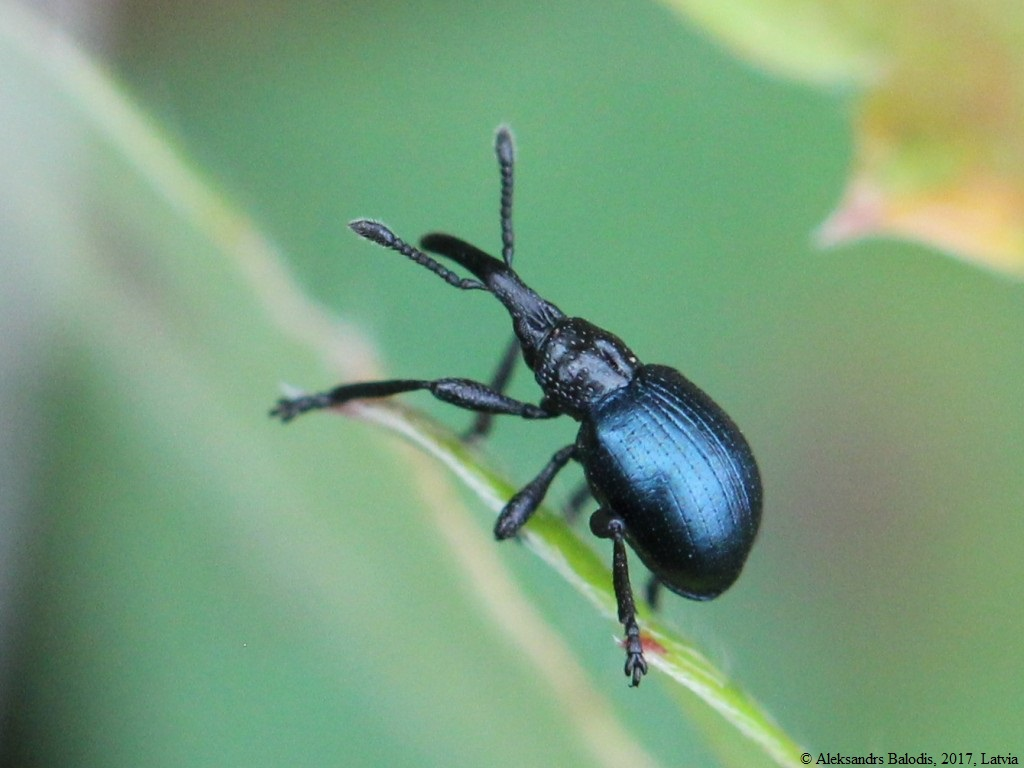
- Taphrotopium sulcifrons

Scientific classification
- Kingdom: Animalia
- Phylum: Arthropoda
- Class: Insecta
- Order: Coleoptera
- Suborder: Polyphaga
- Infraorder: Cucujiformia
- Family: Brentidae
- Genus: Taphrotopium; Reitter, 1916

= Taphrotopium =

Genus of beetles

Taphrotopium is a genus of beetles belonging to the family Apionidae.

The species of this genus are found in Europe.

Species:

- Taphrotopium steveni (Gyllenhal, 1839)
- Taphrotopium sulcifrons (Herbst, 1797)
