= Haplophyllum =

Haplophyllum may refer to:

- Haplophyllum (millipede), a genus of millipedes in the family Julidae
- Haplophyllum (plant), a genus of plants in the family Rutaceae
