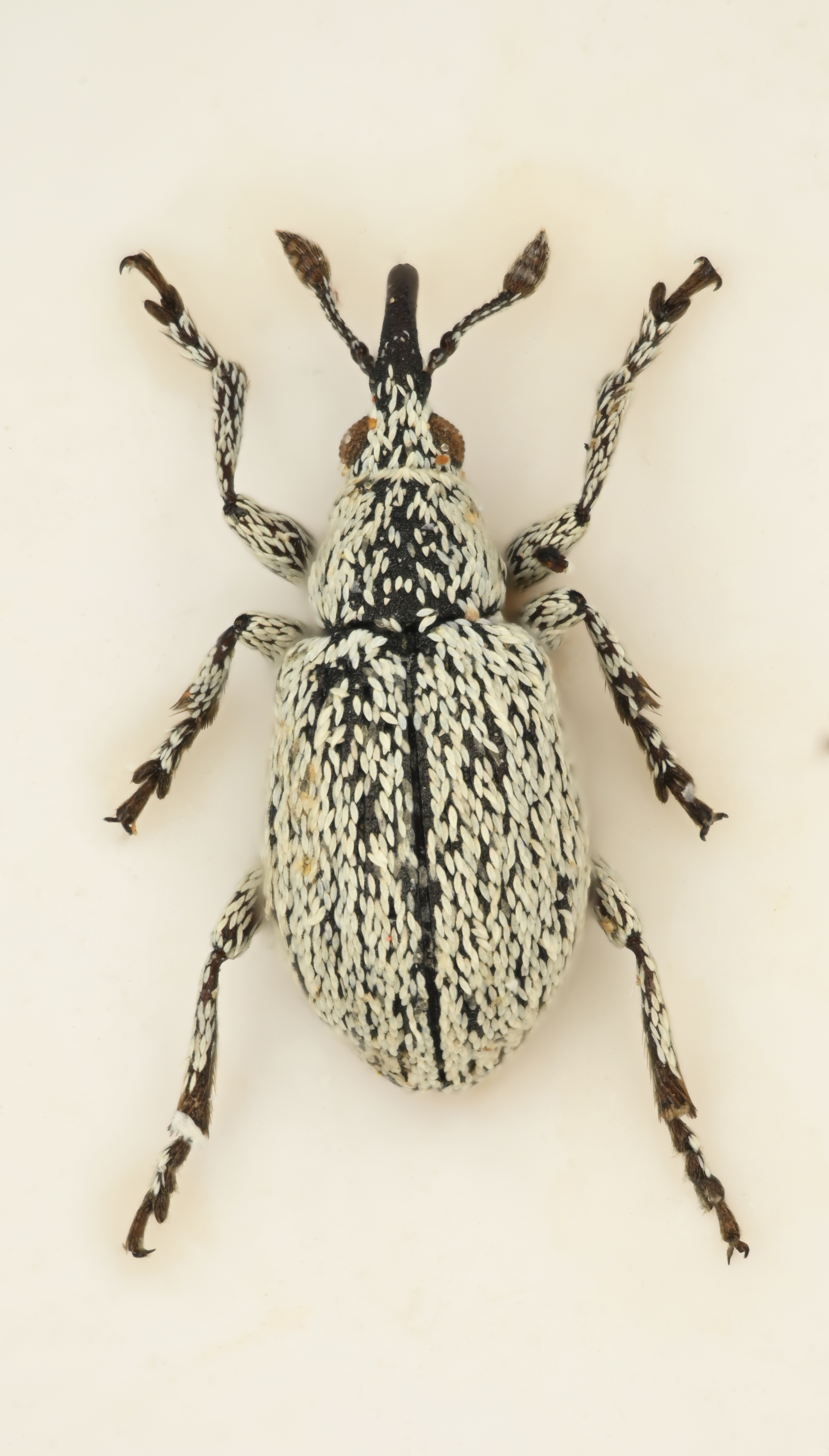
- Metapion squamosum, Libya

Scientific classification
- Domain: Eukaryota
- Kingdom: Animalia
- Phylum: Arthropoda
- Class: Insecta
- Order: Coleoptera
- Suborder: Polyphaga
- Infraorder: Cucujiformia
- Family: Brentidae
- Genus: Metapion
- Species: M. squamosum

Binomial name
- Metapion squamosum (Faust, 1884)

Synonyms
- Apion squamosum Faust, 1884

= Metapion squamosum =

Species of beetle

Metapion squamosum is a species of weevil in the family Brentidae. The species is generally known from Central Asia in countries such as Kazakhstan, Tajikistan, Turkmenistan and Uzbekistan but also appears in parts of Caucasus region (Azerbaijan, Armenia, Georgia). Some sources mention presence in Libya.
