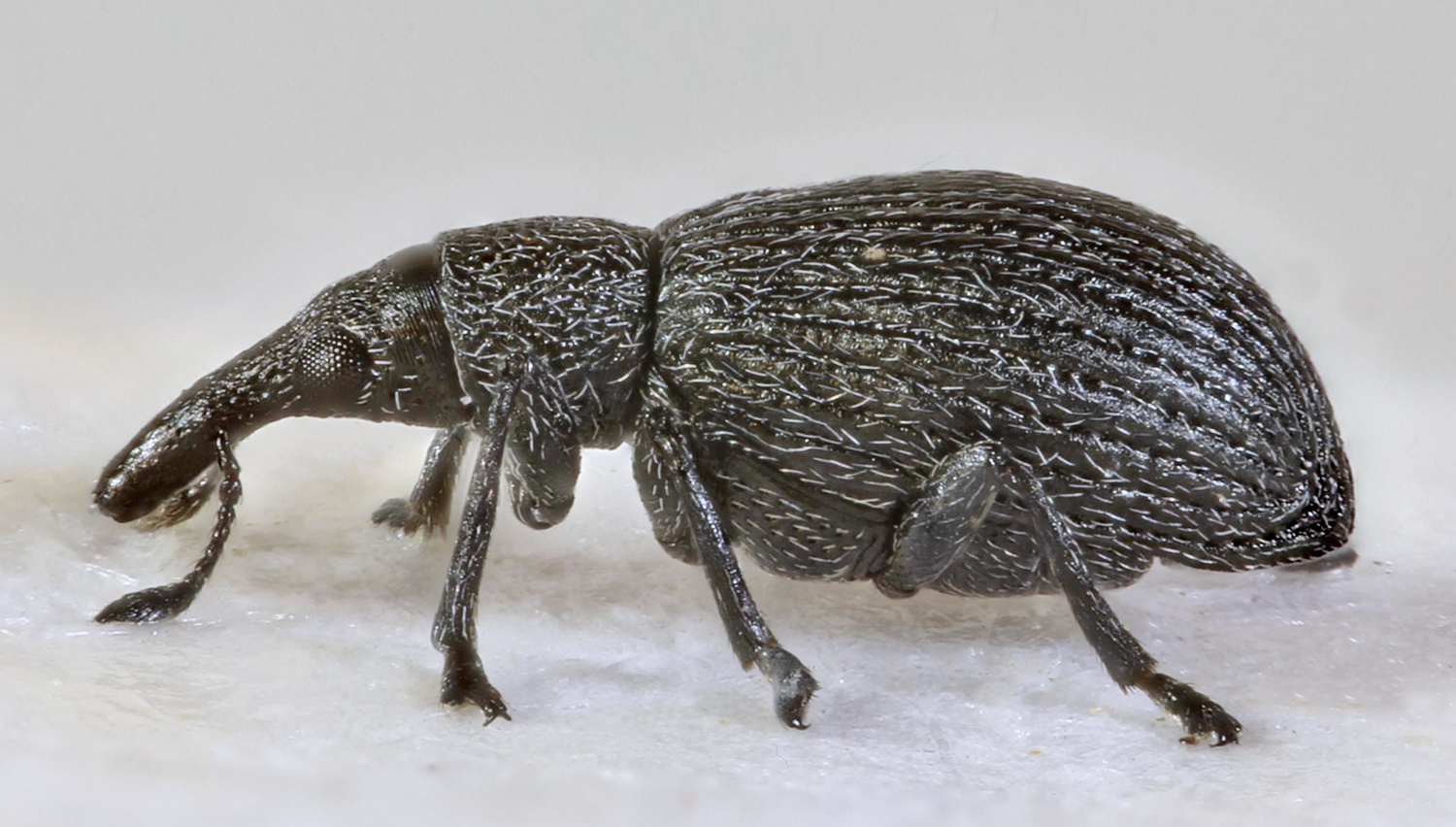

Scientific classification
- Domain: Eukaryota
- Kingdom: Animalia
- Phylum: Arthropoda
- Class: Insecta
- Order: Coleoptera
- Suborder: Polyphaga
- Infraorder: Cucujiformia
- Family: Brentidae
- Genus: Perapion
- Species: P. curtirostre

Binomial name
- Perapion curtirostre (Germar, 1817)

= Perapion curtirostre =

Species of beetle

Perapion curtirostre is a species of pear-shaped weevil in the family of beetles known as Brentidae.

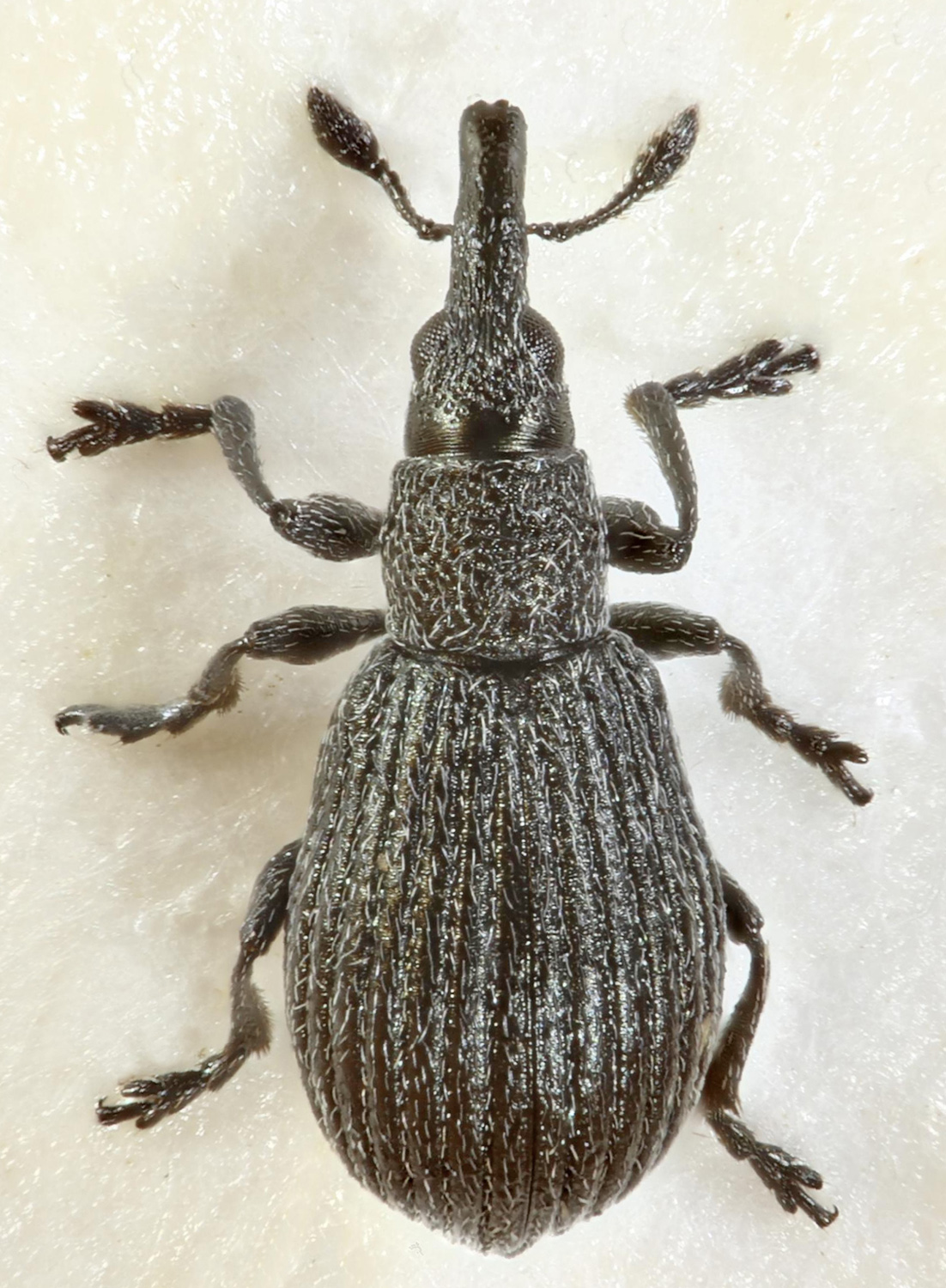
