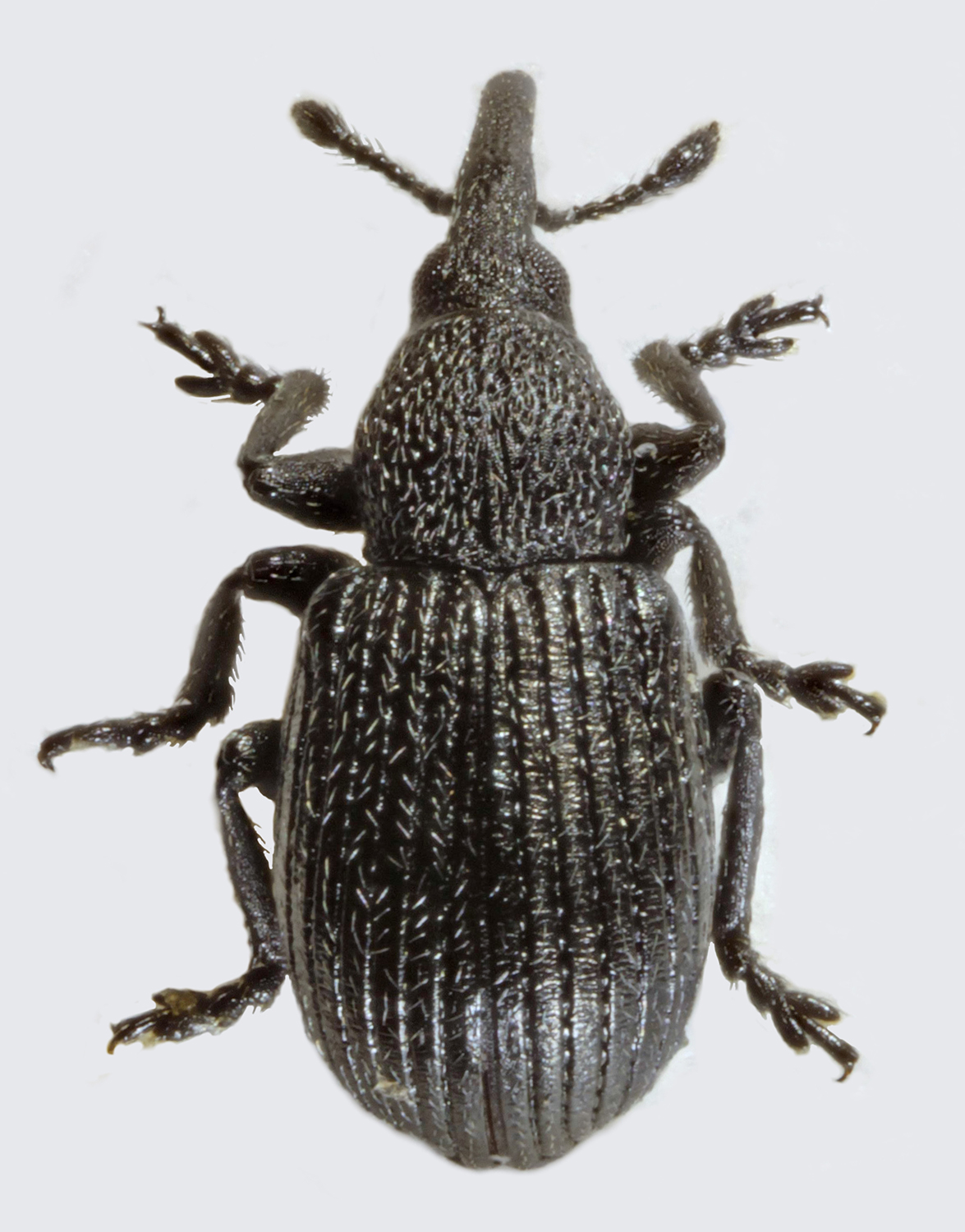
- Omphalapion hookerorum

Scientific classification
- Domain: Eukaryota
- Kingdom: Animalia
- Phylum: Arthropoda
- Class: Insecta
- Order: Coleoptera
- Suborder: Polyphaga
- Infraorder: Cucujiformia
- Family: Brentidae
- Subfamily: Apioninae
- Genus: Omphalapion; Schilsky, 1901

= Omphalapion =

Genus of beetles

Omphalapion is a genus of pear-shaped weevils in the family of beetles known as Brentidae. There are about five described species in Omphalapion.

== Species ==
These five species belong to the genus Omphalapion:

- Omphalapion beuthini (An.Hoffmann, 1874)^{g}
- Omphalapion buddebergi (Bedel, 1887)^{g}
- Omphalapion hookerorum (W. Kirby, 1808)^{g b}
- Omphalapion pseudodispar Wanat, 1995^{g}
- Omphalapion rhodopense (Angelov, 1962)^{g}

Data sources: i = ITIS, c = Catalogue of Life, g = GBIF, b = Bugguide.net
