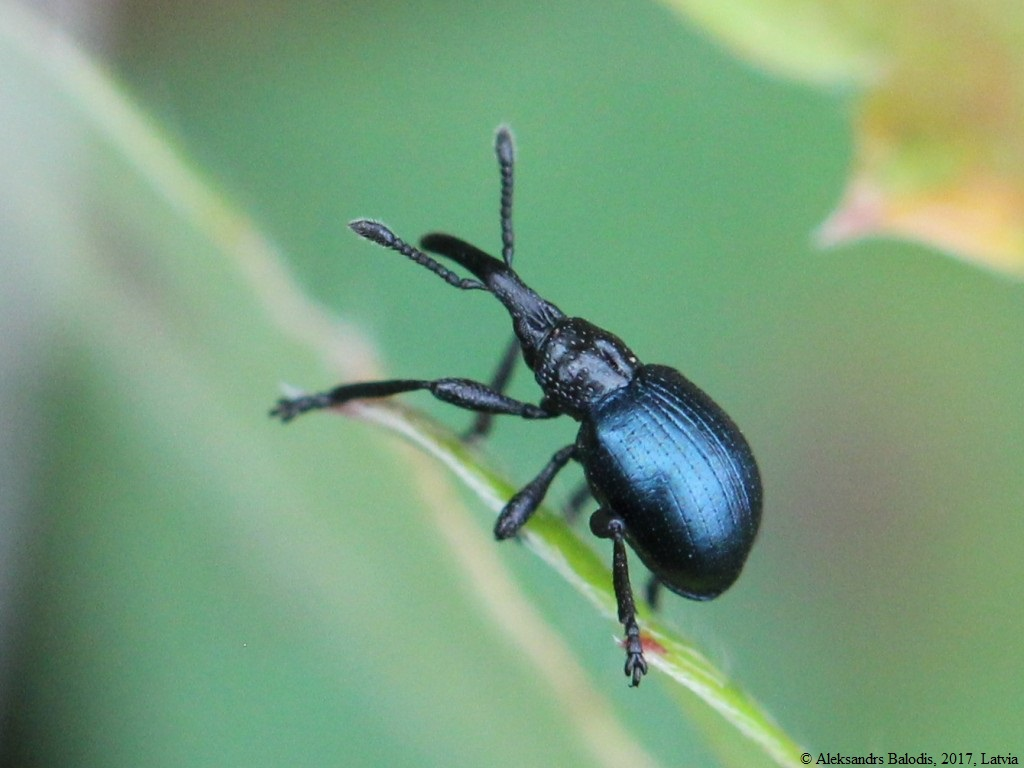

Scientific classification
- Kingdom: Animalia
- Phylum: Arthropoda
- Class: Insecta
- Order: Coleoptera
- Suborder: Polyphaga
- Infraorder: Cucujiformia
- Family: Brentidae
- Genus: Taphrotopium
- Species: T. sulcifrons

Binomial name
- Taphrotopium sulcifrons (Herbst, 1797)

= Taphrotopium sulcifrons =

Species of beetle

Taphrotopium sulcifrons is a beetle in the genus Taphrotopium. It is found in Europe.

== Distribution ==
Taphrotopium sulcifrons can be found in central and eastern Europe. However it is Endangered in the Czech Republic.
