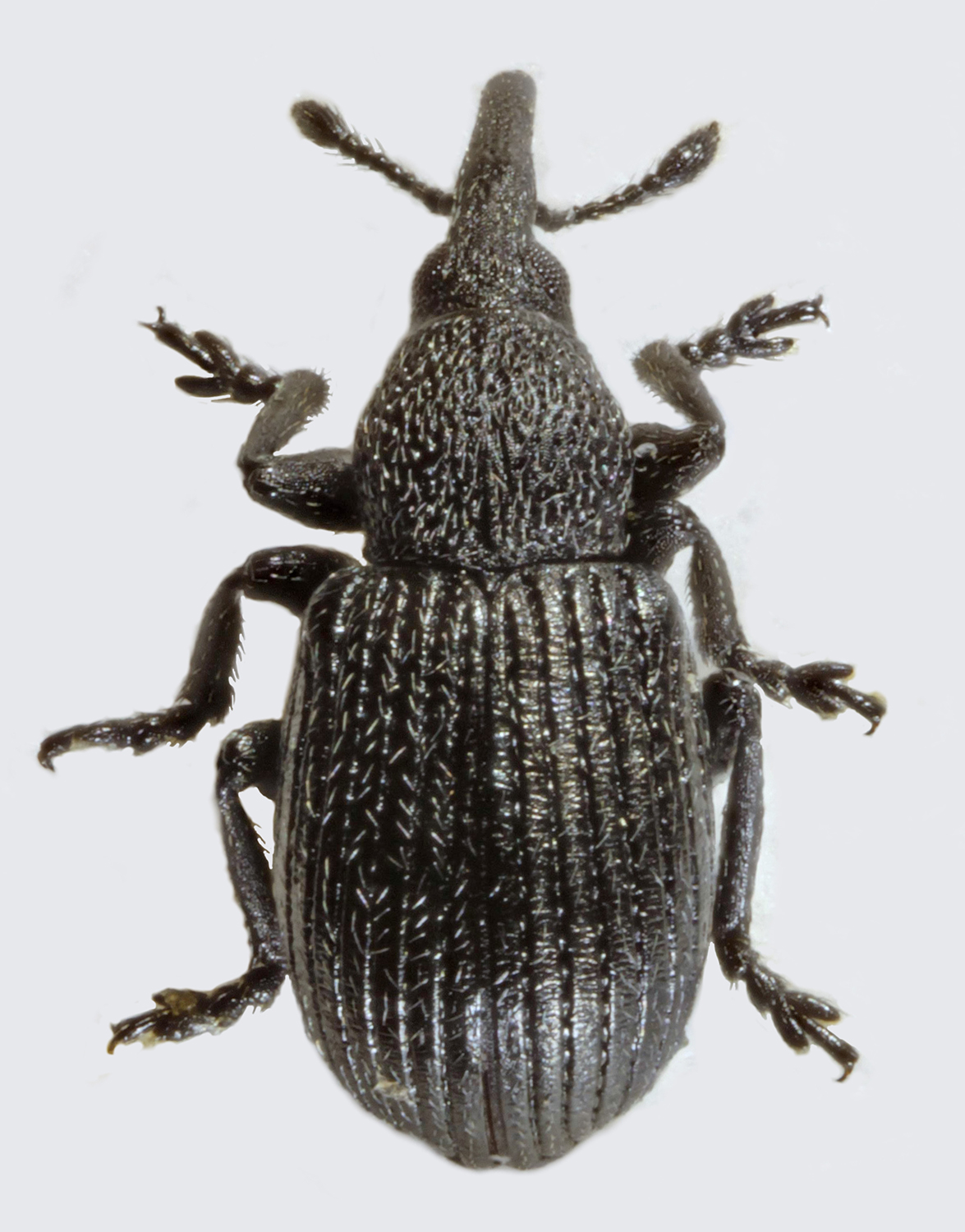

Scientific classification
- Domain: Eukaryota
- Kingdom: Animalia
- Phylum: Arthropoda
- Class: Insecta
- Order: Coleoptera
- Suborder: Polyphaga
- Infraorder: Cucujiformia
- Family: Brentidae
- Genus: Omphalapion
- Species: O. hookerorum

Binomial name
- Omphalapion hookerorum (W. Kirby, 1808)

= Omphalapion hookerorum =

Species of beetle

Omphalapion hookerorum is a species of pear-shaped weevil in the beetle family Brentidae.
