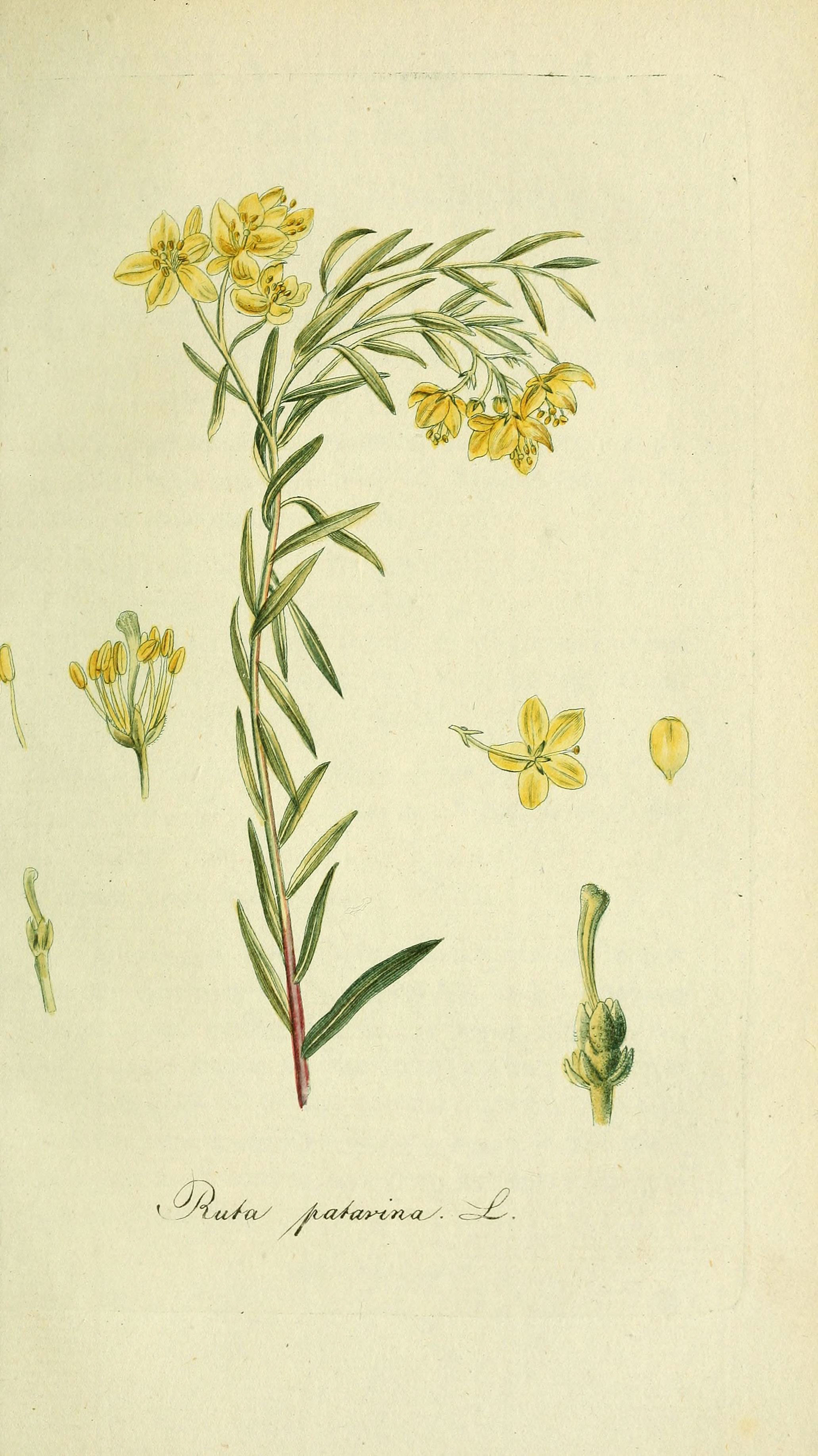

Scientific classification
- Kingdom: Plantae
- Clade: Tracheophytes
- Clade: Angiosperms
- Clade: Eudicots
- Clade: Rosids
- Order: Sapindales
- Family: Rutaceae
- Genus: Haplophyllum
- Species: H. patavinum

Binomial name
- Haplophyllum patavinum (L.) G.Don

Synonyms
- Ruta patavina L. L.

= Haplophyllum patavinum =

Species of plant

Haplophyllum patavinum, commonly known as rue of Padua, is an ornamental plant in the family Rutaceae.
