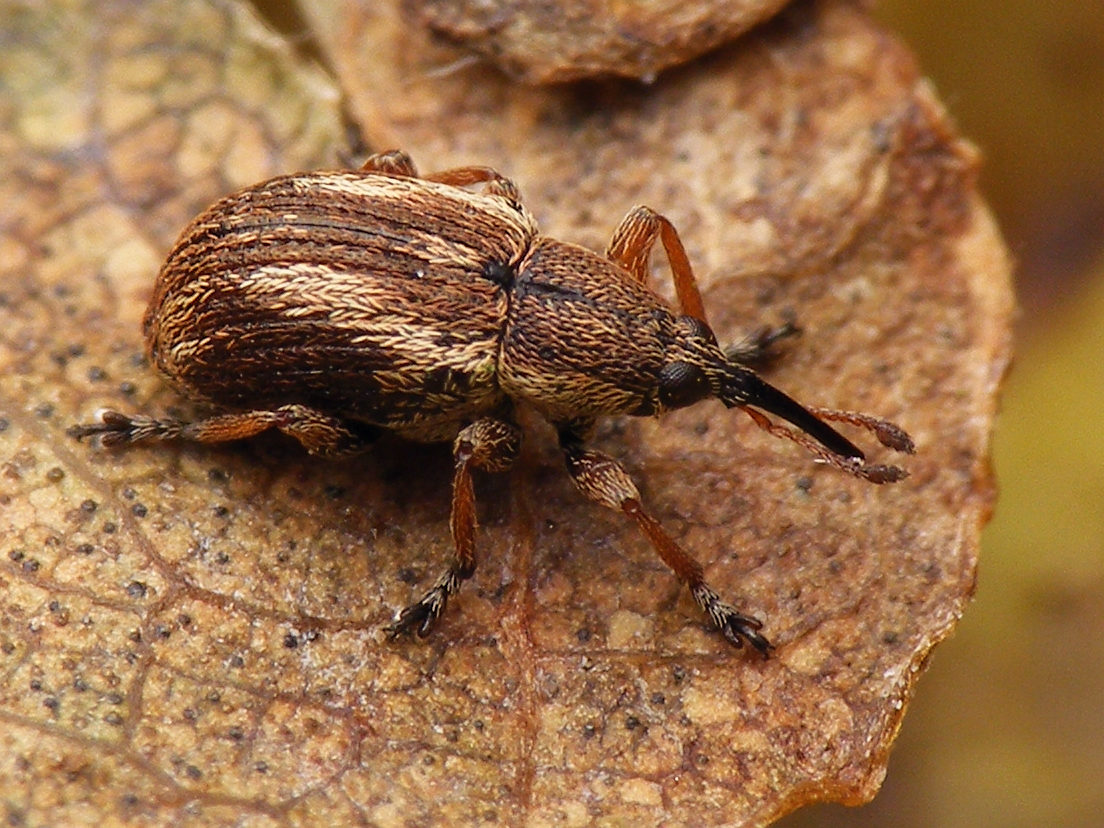

Scientific classification
- Domain: Eukaryota
- Kingdom: Animalia
- Phylum: Arthropoda
- Class: Insecta
- Order: Coleoptera
- Suborder: Polyphaga
- Infraorder: Cucujiformia
- Family: Brentidae
- Genus: Exapion
- Species: E. fuscirostre

Binomial name
- Exapion fuscirostre (Fabricius, 1775)

Synonyms
- Apion fuscirostre

= Exapion fuscirostre =

Species of beetle

Exapion fuscirostre (formerly Apion fuscirostre) is a species of straight-snouted weevil known by the general common name Scotch broom seed weevil. It is used as an agent of biological pest control against the noxious weed known as Scotch broom (Cytisus scoparius).

The adult weevil is dark gray with a dark band across its elytra and is a laterally compressed shape with a long snout and light brown legs. It is 2–3 millimetres (0.079–0.118 in) long. The adult feeds on new growth at the tips of stems, but the larva does much more damage to the plant. The adult female lays eggs inside the plant's seed pod, where the larvae hatch and consume the seeds over a period of a few weeks.

This weevil is native to Europe. It has been released in the western United States, where it has shown promise as a biocontrol agent for Scotch broom. It is now widespread in the Pacific Northwest.

There is a parasitic wasp, Pteromalus sequester, that uses the weevil as a host. This could possibly hinder efforts to keep the weevil established, but further study is needed.
