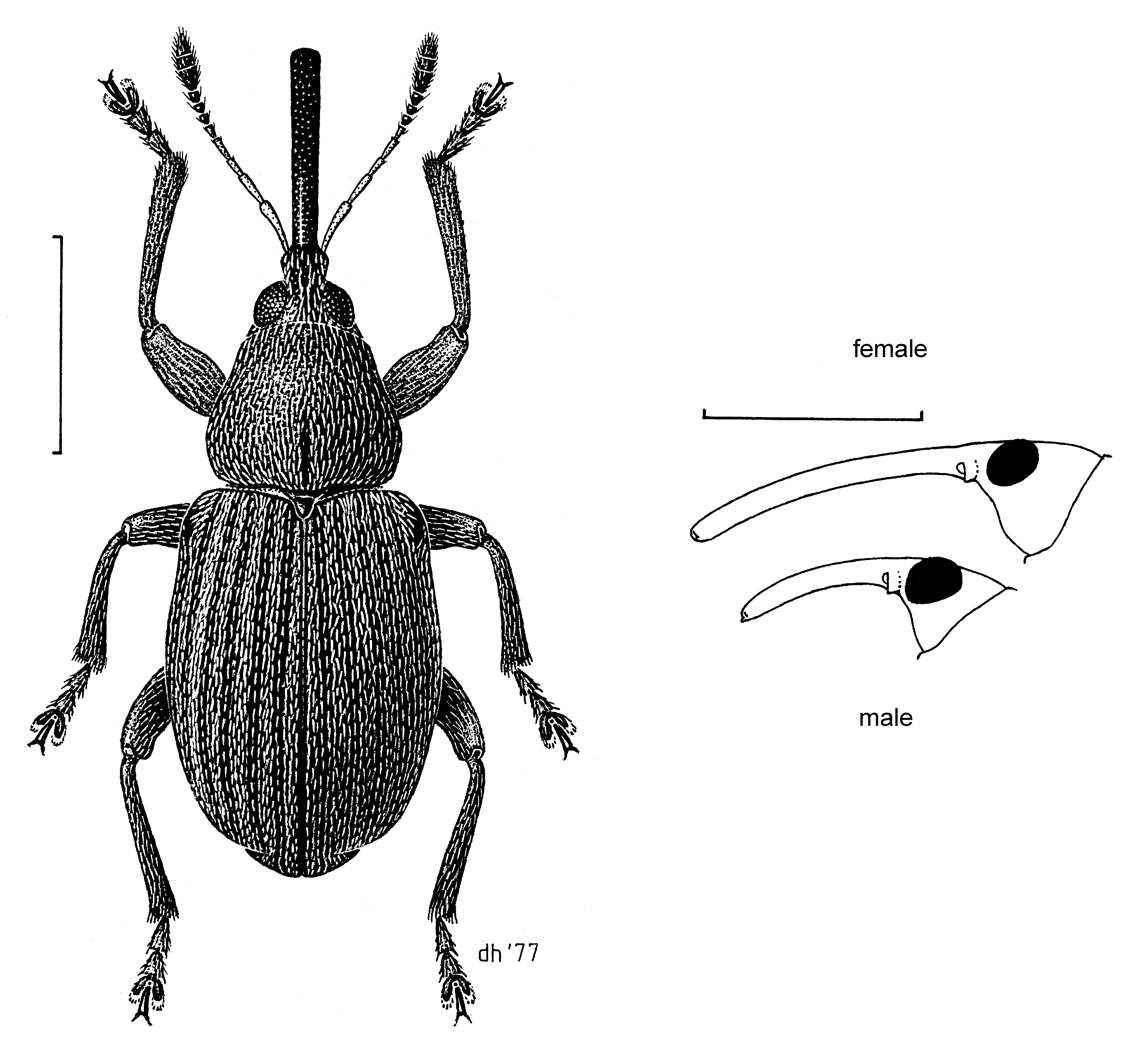

Scientific classification
- Domain: Eukaryota
- Kingdom: Animalia
- Phylum: Arthropoda
- Class: Insecta
- Order: Coleoptera
- Suborder: Polyphaga
- Infraorder: Cucujiformia
- Family: Brentidae
- Genus: Exapion
- Species: E. ulicis

Binomial name
- Exapion ulicis (Forster, 1771)

Synonyms
- Apion ulicis

= Exapion ulicis =

Species of beetle

Exapion ulicis (formerly Apion ulicis) is a species of straight-snouted weevil known by the general common name Gorse Seed Weevil. It is used as an agent of biological pest control against Common Gorse (Ulex europaeus), which is classified as a noxious weed in some countries.

The adult weevil is light gray in color with a long snout half as long as its body. It is 2 to 3 millimeters long in total. The adult feeds on gorse by digging into the soft tissue of the stem and spines with its snout, creating characteristic round holes as evidence. The larva does more damage, however. It emerges from its egg inside the gorse seed pod and feeds on the seeds for six to eight weeks. The larva then pupates for about two months.

This weevil is native to western Europe. It was first introduced to New Zealand in 1931 and to California as an agent of gorse control in the 1950s. It is currently established in gorse populations in the western United States and in Hawaii. Destruction of seeds may reduce the spread of gorse, which is the main method of biological control by this weevil. It does not eliminate existing stands of the plant, since the adults do not do enough damage to destroy or significantly weaken whole plants.

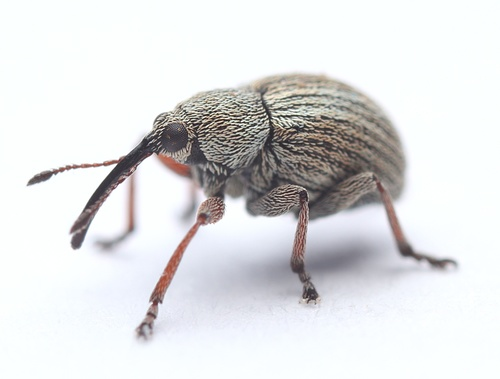
Gorse Seed Weevil seen in New Zealand
