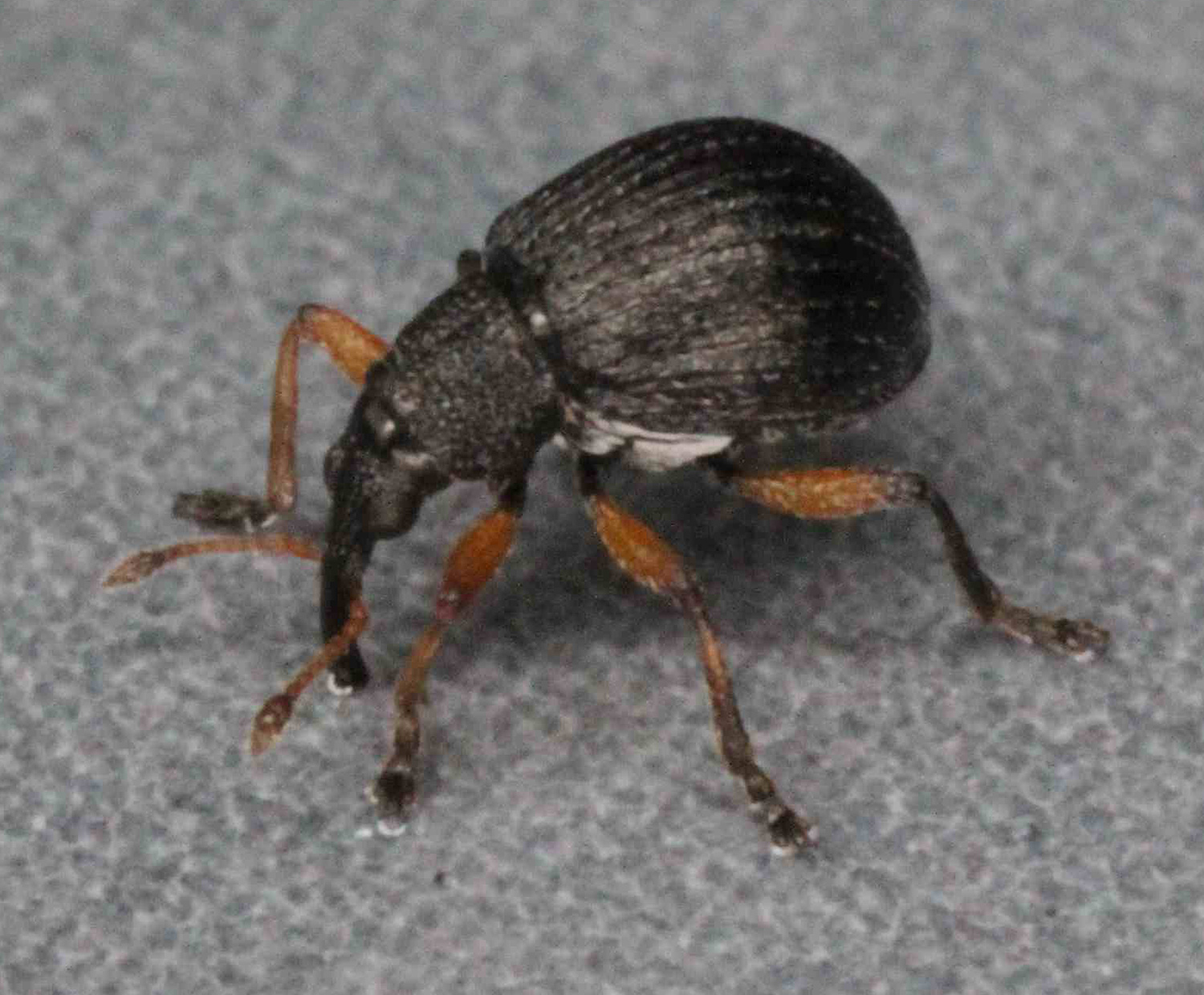

Scientific classification
- Kingdom: Animalia
- Phylum: Arthropoda
- Clade: Pancrustacea
- Class: Insecta
- Order: Coleoptera
- Suborder: Polyphaga
- Infraorder: Cucujiformia
- Superfamily: Curculionoidea
- Family: Brentidae
- Genus: Eutrichapion
- Species: E. viciae

Binomial name
- Eutrichapion viciae (Paykull, 1800)

= Eutrichapion viciae =

Species of beetle

Eutrichapion viciae is a species of pear-shaped weevil in the family of beetles known as Brentidae.
