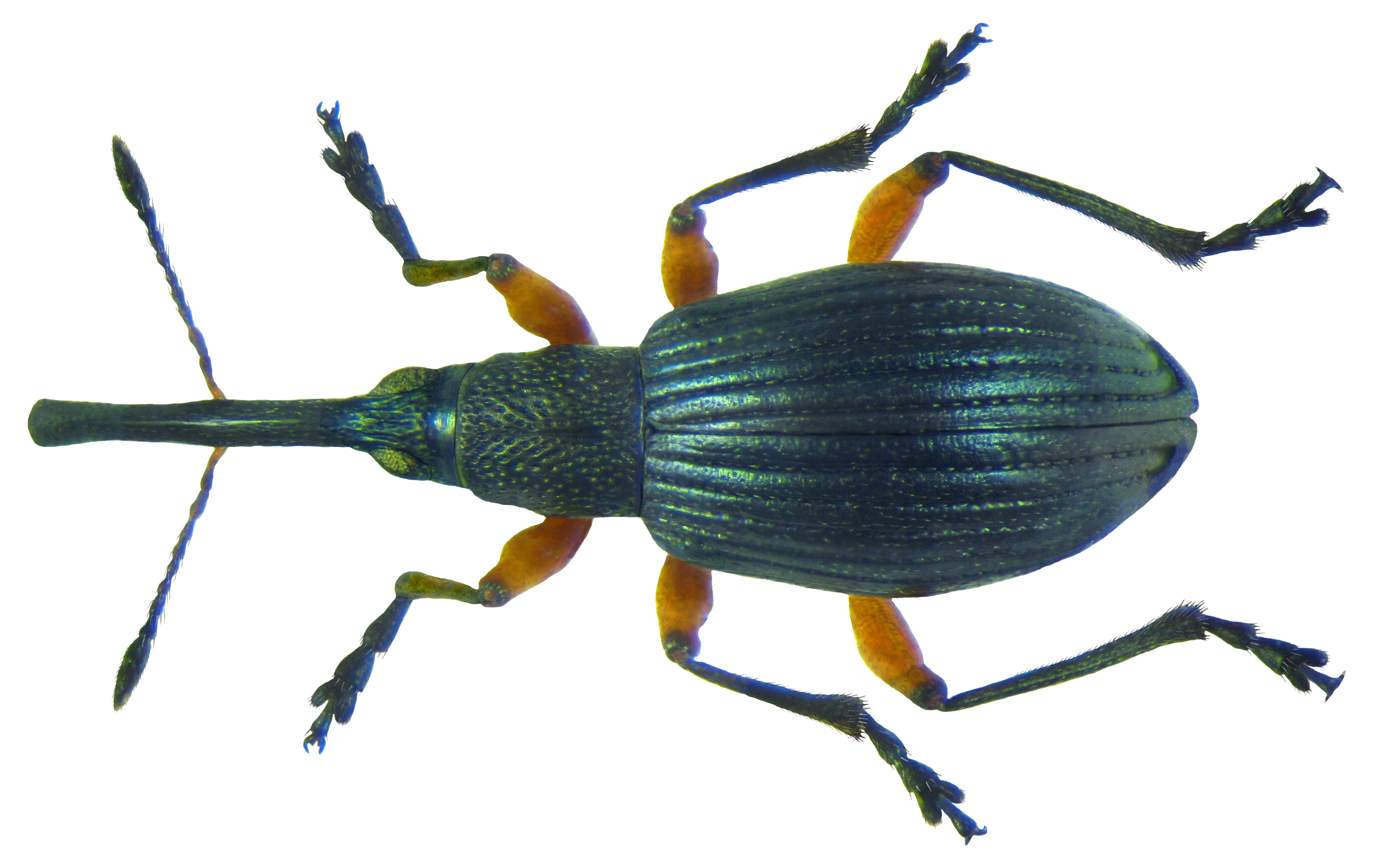

Scientific classification
- Kingdom: Animalia
- Phylum: Arthropoda
- Class: Insecta
- Order: Coleoptera
- Suborder: Polyphaga
- Infraorder: Cucujiformia
- Family: Brentidae
- Genus: Protapion
- Species: P. apricans

Binomial name
- Protapion apricans Herbst, 1797

= Protapion apricans =

Species of beetle

Apion apricans is a species of seed weevils native to Europe. It is widespread everywhere. Damages clover and wild. The beetle is 3–3.5 mm in size, black, with a metallic hue, the body is pear-shaped, the legs are partially yellow; rostrum long, almost straight; apex of antennae black, base - red. Egg - 0.3-0.5 mm, yellowish, long, smooth. Larva 2–2.5 mm, white with a creamy hue, curved, dark brown head, on the upper jaws on each side of three growths, the middle of them increased; instead of legs six pairs of small knolls. Pupa 3–3.5 mm, yellowish white.

Winter bugs on crops and in natural clover plants in the soil, at a depth of up to 5 cm, in forest belts, fringes, ravines, on the borders, roadsides - under fallen leaves and plant remains. Beetles from wintering places come out in 1-2 decades of April during the period of clover growth and feed on the parenchyma of young leaves during 15–21 days, gnawing out small holes. In the second half of May, during the budding phase of clover, females lay one egg each in lateral leaf and flower buds, embryonic heads, and as the latter develops to flowering. The average fecundity of the female is 35 eggs, with a fluctuation from 11 to 217. For laying eggs, the female gnaws a pit with a rostrum, pushing the egg into it with the ovipositor. Embryonic development of the egg lasts 5–8 days. Larvae appear in the head before the beginning of flowering (late May - early June), and in the second decade of June, during the mass flowering period, larvae of different ages and pupae can be found in the head.

The development of larvae in forest-steppe conditions lasts 15–20 days. Before pupation, the larva leaves the ovary and moves to the interval between the flowers on the head bud, where it gnaws a hole in which it pupates. During the digging of the fossa, the larva damages the vessels that feed the flower, so that they or parts of them become brown and wither (mid-June). The pupa develops in 8–9 days. The entire period of development from egg to adult is 30 – 32 days. Beetles appear from the second half of July to September, sometimes - until October. They actively feed on young leaves of clover. During the summer period one generation is developing. Beetles can live and reproduce for 2–3 years.

The harmfulness of the seed is quite high. Beetles feed on the leaves of the clover, gnawing holes. In the case of mass reproduction, the leaves are completely perforated with holes. Very prone to damage to the clover staircase. In dry weather, beetles can eat weeds: burdock, nettle, thistle, carrots, chicken millets etc. Larvae eat leaf buds of underdeveloped heads and seed germ. One larva destroys 5-11 ovaries. The number of larvae in the head can be 5-7 or more. The total damage to the heads is 80-100%. The decrease in the yield of clover seeds reaches 25-30%.
