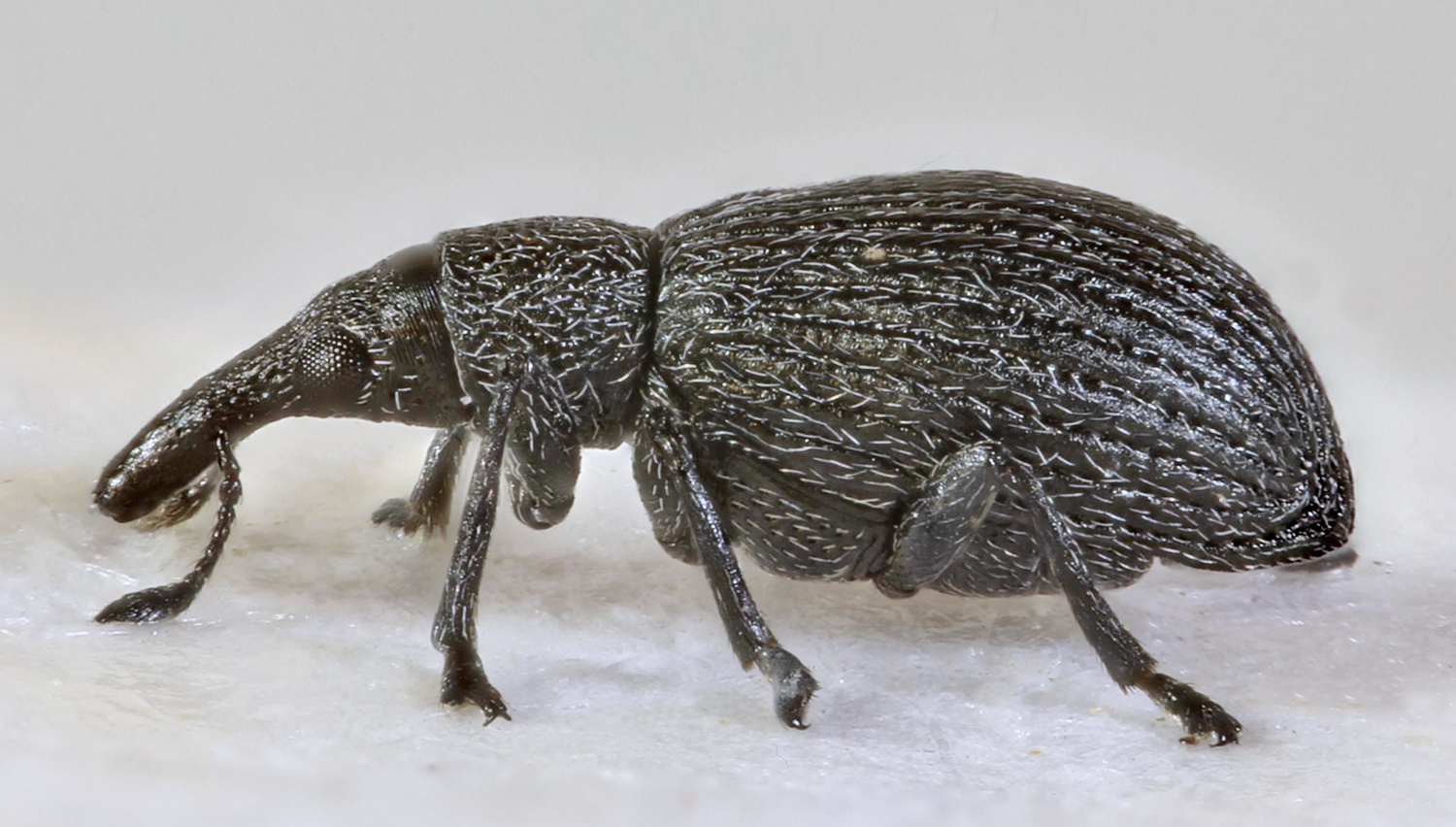
- Perapion curtirostre

Scientific classification
- Domain: Eukaryota
- Kingdom: Animalia
- Phylum: Arthropoda
- Class: Insecta
- Order: Coleoptera
- Suborder: Polyphaga
- Infraorder: Cucujiformia
- Family: Brentidae
- Tribe: Aplemonini
- Genus: Perapion; Wagner, 1907

Synonyms
- List: Eroosapion Ehret, 1994; Hemiperapion Wagner, 1930; Parapion Bokor, 1923; Peripion Beguin-Billeococq, 1910; Pexapion Schubert, 1957; Rhaphidoplectron Alonso-Zarazaga, 1991

= Perapion =

Genus of beetles

Perapion is a genus of pear-shaped weevils in the beetle family Brentidae.

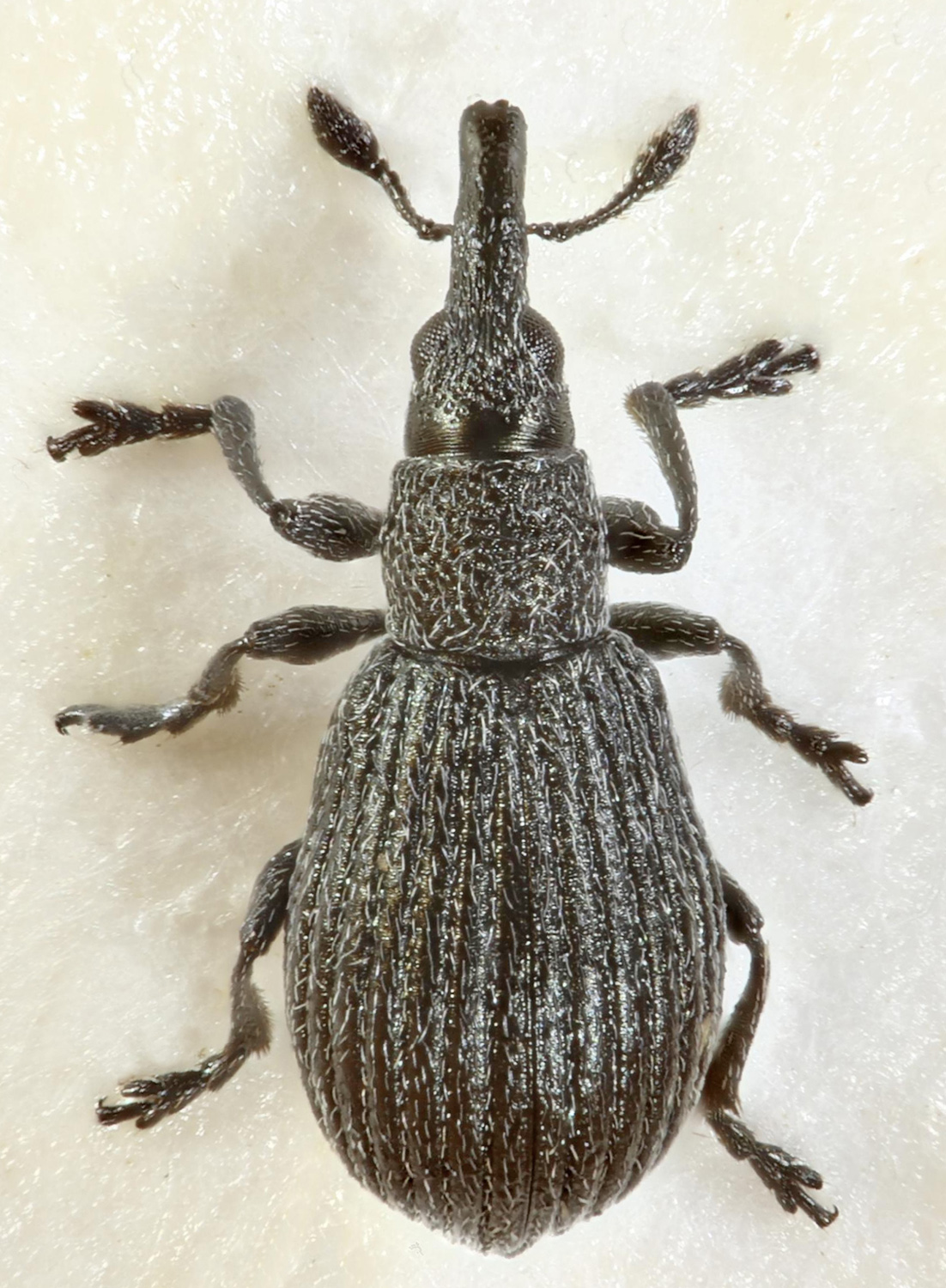
Perapion curtirostre

== Species ==
The following species are recognised in the genus Perapion:

- Apion profundum (von Schlechtendal, 1894)
- Perapion affine (Kirby, 1808)
- Perapion antiquum (Gyllenhal, 1833)
- Perapion connexum (Schilsky, 1902)
- Perapion curtirostre (Germar, 1817)
- Perapion defensum (Faust, 1887)
- Perapion ehreti Legalov, 2000
- Perapion horvathi (Schilsky, 1901)
- Perapion hydrolapathi (Marsham, 1802)
- Perapion ilvense (Wagner, 1905)
- Perapion jacobsoni (Wagner, 1910)
- Perapion (Perapion) jelineki (Bajtenov & Fremuth, 1981)
- Perapion lemoroi (C.Brisout de Barneville, 1880)
- Perapion marchicum (Herbst, 1797)
- Perapion (Perapion) marseuli (Wencker, 1864)
- Perapion menatensis Legalov, Nel & Kirejtshuk, 2017
- Perapion neofallax (Warner, 1958)
- Perapion oblongum (Gyllenhal, 1827)
- Perapion punctinasum (J.B.Smith, 1884)
- Perapion rasnitsyni Legalov, 2018
- Perapion sedi
- Perapion subviolaceum (Desbrochers, 1908)
- Perapion terminassianae Legalov, 2000
- Perapion violaceum (Kirby, 1808)
- Perapion wickhami (Kissinger, 1960)
