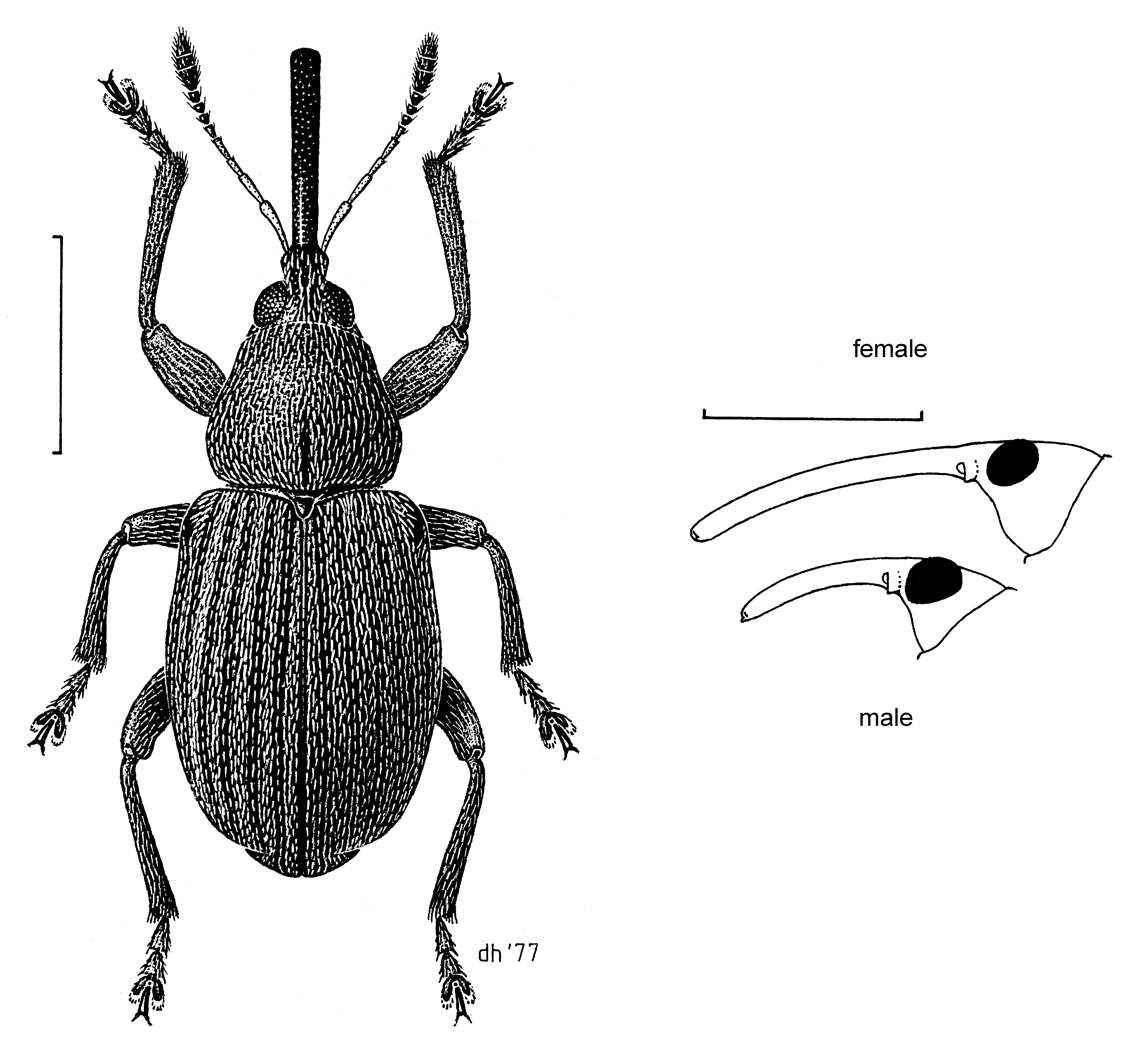
- Exapion ulicis

Scientific classification
- Domain: Eukaryota
- Kingdom: Animalia
- Phylum: Arthropoda
- Class: Insecta
- Order: Coleoptera
- Suborder: Polyphaga
- Infraorder: Cucujiformia
- Family: Brentidae
- Genus: Exapion; Bedel, 1887

Species
- see text

= Exapion =

Genus of beetles

Exapion is a genus of straight-snouted weevils.

Species include:

- Exapion formaniki
- Exapion fuscirostre - Scotch broom seed weevil
- Exapion malvae
- Exapion putoni
- Exapion ulicis - gorse seed weevil

Several Exapion species were formerly included in genus Apion.
