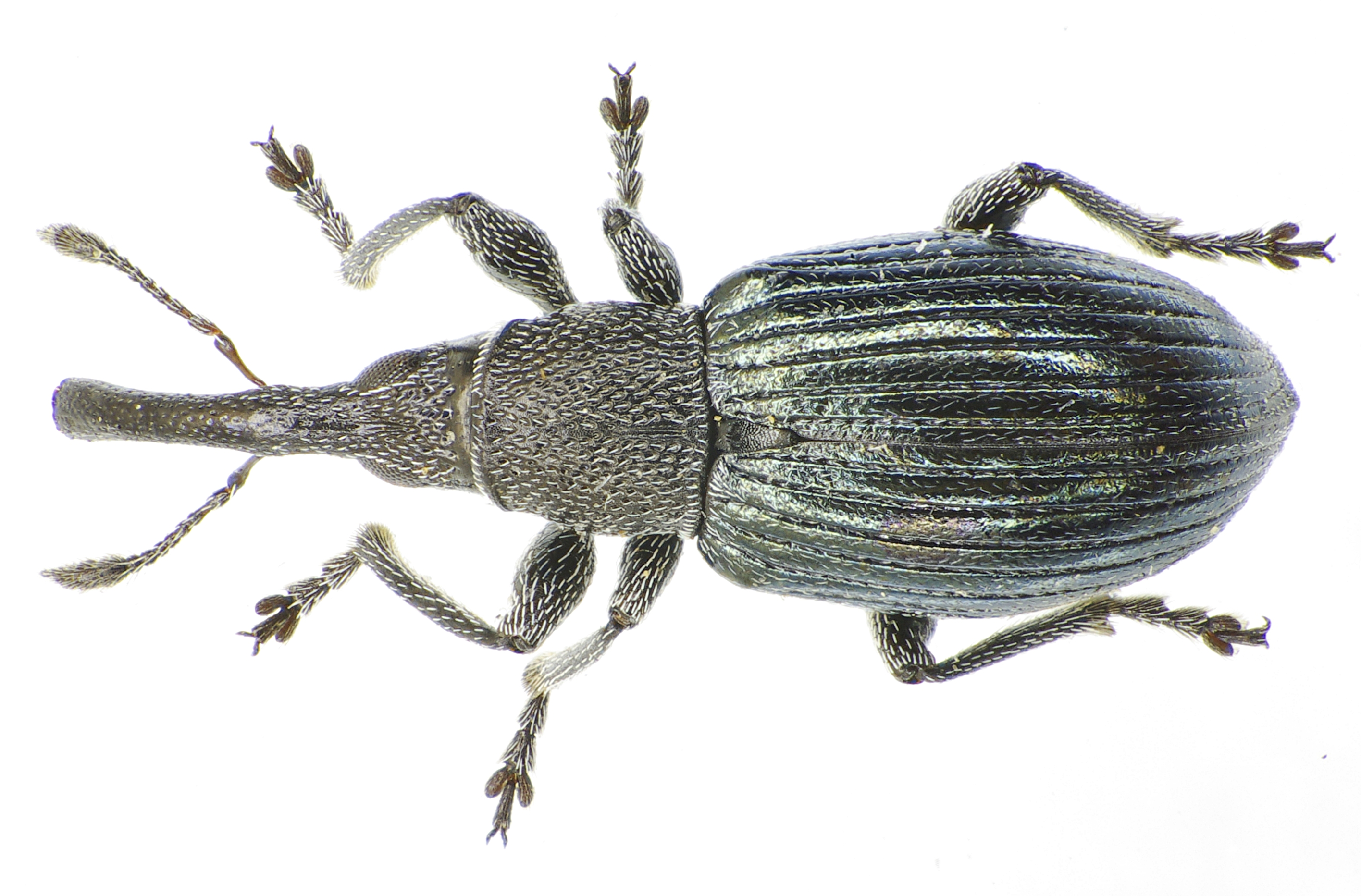
- Aspidapion validum

Scientific classification
- Domain: Eukaryota
- Kingdom: Animalia
- Phylum: Arthropoda
- Class: Insecta
- Order: Coleoptera
- Suborder: Polyphaga
- Infraorder: Cucujiformia
- Family: Brentidae
- Genus: Aspidapion; Schilsky, 1901

= Aspidapion =

Genus of beetles

Aspidapion is a genus of beetles belonging to the family Brentidae. The species of this genus are found in Europe and Africa.

== Species ==
The following species are recognised in the genus Aspidapion:

- Aspidapion acerifoliae Suppantschitsch, 1996
- Aspidapion aeneum (Fabricius, 1775)
- Aspidapion caprai Giusto, 1993
- Aspidapion radiolus Marsham, 1802
- Aspidapion roudieri Richard, 1957
- Aspidapion soror (Rey, 1895)
- Aspidapion validum (Germar, 1817)
