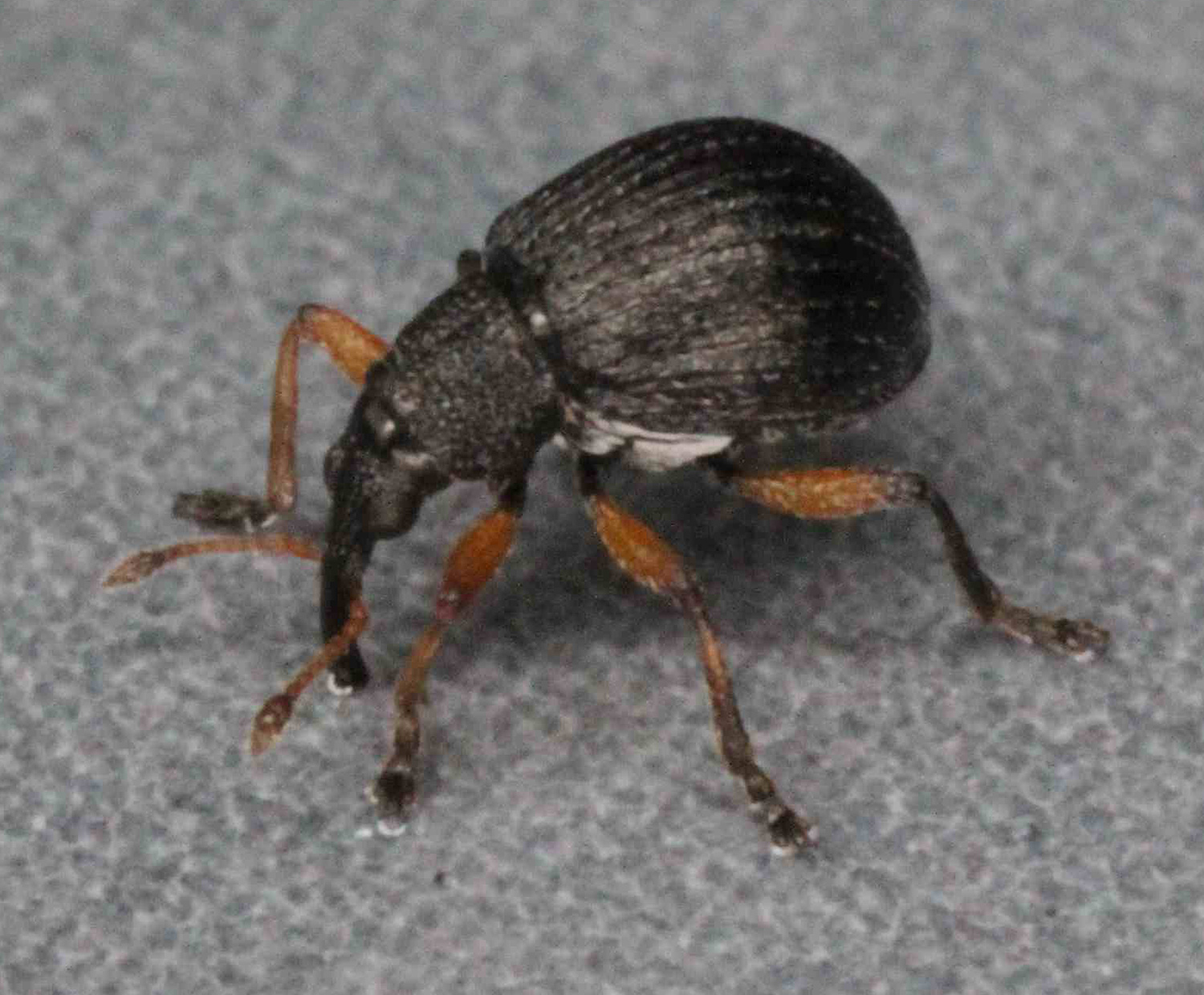
- Eutrichapion viciae

Scientific classification
- Kingdom: Animalia
- Phylum: Arthropoda
- Class: Insecta
- Order: Coleoptera
- Suborder: Polyphaga
- Infraorder: Cucujiformia
- Family: Brentidae
- Subtribe: Oxystomatina
- Genus: Eutrichapion; Reitter, 1916

= Eutrichapion =

Genus of beetles

Eutrichapion is a genus of pear-shaped weevils in the beetles family Brentidae. There are about eight described species in the genus Eutrichapion.

== Species ==
These eight species belong to the genus Eutrichapion:

- Eutrichapion cavifrons (LeConte, 1857)^{g b}
- Eutrichapion gribodoi (Desbrochers, 1896)^{g}
- Eutrichapion huron (Fall, 1898)^{g b}
- Eutrichapion hydropicum (Wencker, 1864)^{g}
- Eutrichapion mystriophorum Alonso-Zarazaga, 1994^{g}
- Eutrichapion punctiger (Paykull, 1792)^{g}
- Eutrichapion rhomboidale (Desbrochers, 1870)^{g}
- Eutrichapion viciae (Paykull, 1800)^{g b}

Data sources: i = ITIS, c = Catalogue of Life, g = GBIF, b = Bugguide.net
