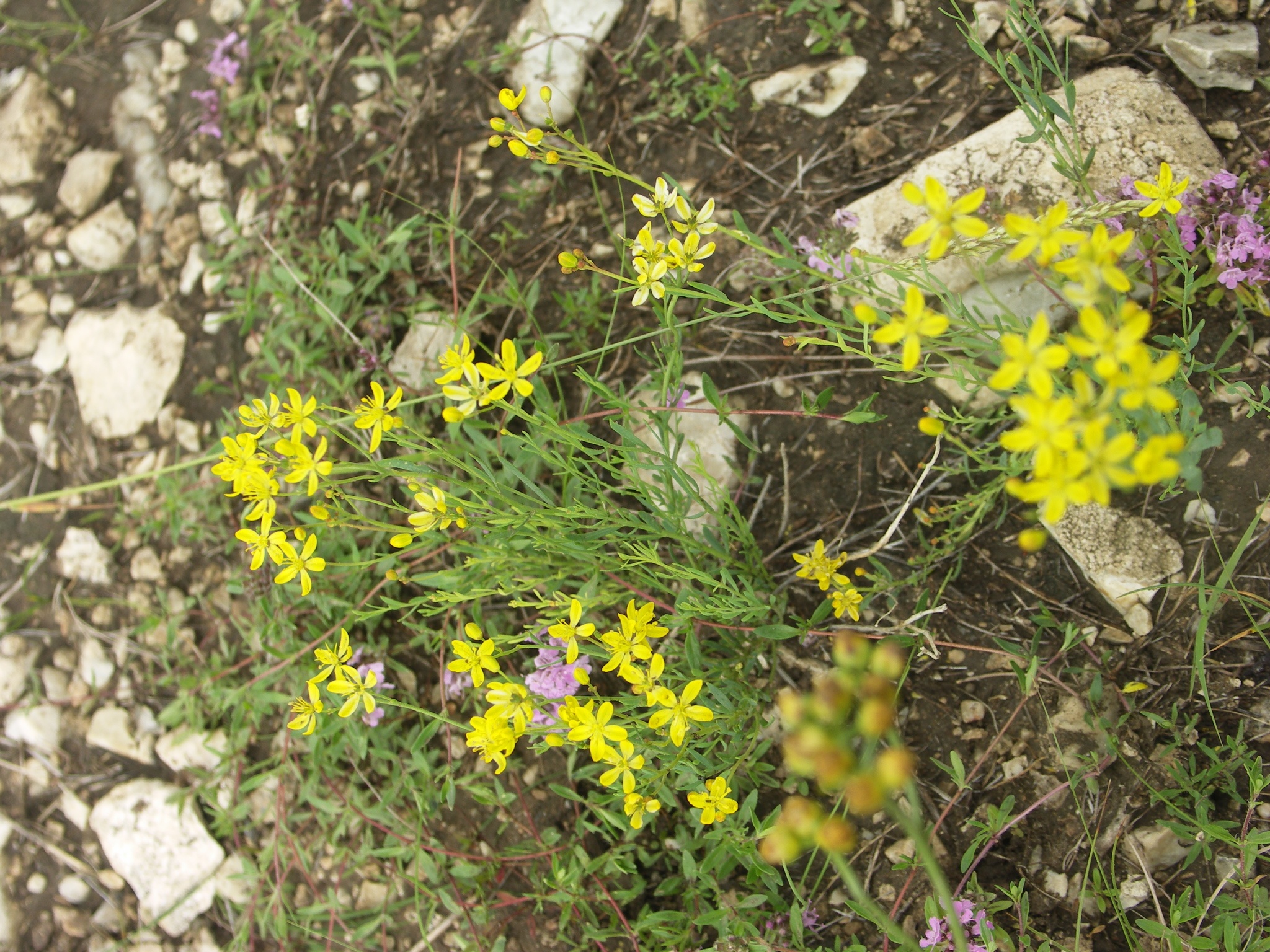
- Haplophyllum dauricum

Scientific classification
- Kingdom: Plantae
- Clade: Tracheophytes
- Clade: Angiosperms
- Clade: Eudicots
- Clade: Rosids
- Order: Sapindales
- Family: Rutaceae
- Subfamily: Haplophylloideae; Appelhans et al.
- Genus: Haplophyllum; A.Juss.

= Haplophyllum (plant) =

Genus of plants

Haplophyllum is a genus of flowering plants belonging to the family Rutaceae. It is the only genus in the subfamily Haplophylloideae.

Its native range is Mediterranean regions to Southern Siberia and Somalia.

Species:

- Haplophyllum acutifolium (DC.) G.Don
- Haplophyllum alberti-regelii Korovin
- Haplophyllum amoenum (O.Schwartz) C.C.Towns.
- Haplophyllum arbuscula Franch.
- Haplophyllum armenum Spach
- Haplophyllum bakhteganicum Soltani & Khosravi
- Haplophyllum balcanicum Vandas
- Haplophyllum bastetanum F.B.Navarro, Suár.-Sant. & Blanca
- Haplophyllum blanchei Boiss.
- Haplophyllum boissierianum Vis. & Pancic
- Haplophyllum broussonetianum Coss.
- Haplophyllum bucharicum Litv.
- Haplophyllum buhsei Boiss.
- Haplophyllum bungei Trautv.
- Haplophyllum buxbaumii (Poir.) G.Don
- Haplophyllum canaliculatum Boiss.
- Haplophyllum cappadocicum Spach
- Haplophyllum ciscaucasicum (Rupr.) Grossh. & Vved.
- Haplophyllum cordatum (D.Don) G.Don
- Haplophyllum coronatum Griseb.
- Haplophyllum crenulatum Boiss.
- Haplophyllum dasygynum C.C.Towns.
- Haplophyllum dauricum (L.) G.Don
- Haplophyllum dshungaricum Rubtzov
- Haplophyllum dubium Korovin
- Haplophyllum ermenekense Ulukus & Tugay
- Haplophyllum erythraeum Boiss.
- Haplophyllum eugenii-korovinii Pavlov
- Haplophyllum ferganicum Vved.
- Haplophyllum fruticulosum (Labill.) G.Don
- Haplophyllum furfuraceum Bunge
- Haplophyllum gilesii (Hemsl.) C.C.Towns.
- Haplophyllum glaberrimum Bunge
- Haplophyllum griffithianum Boiss.
- Haplophyllum kowalenskyi Stschegl.
- Haplophyllum laeviusculum C.C.Towns.
- Haplophyllum laristanicum C.C.Towns.
- Haplophyllum latifolium Kar. & Kir.
- Haplophyllum linifolium (L.) G.Don
- Haplophyllum lissonotum C.C.Towns.
- Haplophyllum luteoversicolor C.C.Towns.
- Haplophyllum megalanthum Bornm.
- Haplophyllum molle (O.Schwartz) C.C.Towns.
- Haplophyllum monadelphum Afan.
- Haplophyllum multicaule Vved.
- Haplophyllum myrtifolium Boiss.
- Haplophyllum obtusifolium (Ledeb. ex Eichw.) Ledeb.
- Haplophyllum patavinum (L.) G.Don
- Haplophyllum pedicellatum Bunge ex Boiss.
- Haplophyllum poorei C.C.Towns.
- Haplophyllum ptilostylum Spach
- Haplophyllum pumiliforme Hub.-Mor. & Reese
- Haplophyllum ramosissimum (Paulsen) Vved.
- Haplophyllum rechingeri C.C.Towns.
- Haplophyllum robustum Bunge
- Haplophyllum rubrotinctum C.C.Towns.
- Haplophyllum sahinii Tugay & Ulukus
- Haplophyllum sanguineum Thulin
- Haplophyllum shelkovnikovii Grossh.
- Haplophyllum stapfanum Hand.-Mazz.
- Haplophyllum suaveolens (DC.) G.Don
- Haplophyllum telephioides Boiss.
- Haplophyllum tenue Boiss.
- Haplophyllum thesioides (Fisch. ex DC.) G.Don
- Haplophyllum tragacanthoides Diels
- Haplophyllum tuberculatum (Forssk.) A.Juss.
- Haplophyllum versicolor Fisch. & C.A.Mey.
- Haplophyllum villosum (M.Bieb.) G.Don
- Haplophyllum vulcanicum Boiss. & Heldr.
- Haplophyllum vvedenskyi Nevski
