= Friedrich Julius Schilsky =

German entomologist

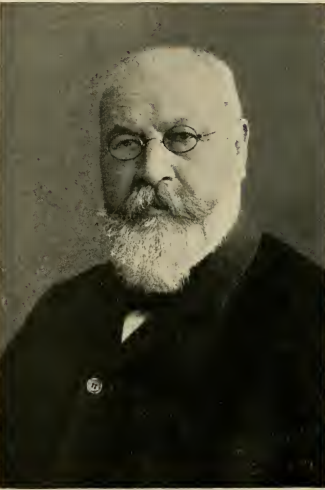
Friedrich Julius Schilsky

Friedrich Julius Schilsky (1848–1912) was a German entomologist. He was secretary of the Entomological Society of Berlin. His principal work was a catalogue of German beetles Systematisches Verzeichnis der Käfer Deutschlands, mit besonderer Berücksichtigung ihrer geographischen Verbreitung. Zugleich ein Käfer-Verzeichnis der Mark Brandenburg (Berlin, 1888). In 1894, he continued Die Käfer Europas started by Heinrich Carl Küster (1807–1876), briefly succeeded by Ernst Gustav Kraatz (1831–1909) and Ernest August Hellmuth von Kiesenwetter (1820–1880). Schilsky, wrote the seventeen last volumes (completed 1911). His collections are in Museum für Naturkunde in Berlin.
