= M. grammica =

M. grammica may refer to:

- Miaenia grammica, a beetle species
- Mordellistena grammica, a beetle species
