= M. brevicollis =

M. brevicollis may refer to:

- Meloe brevicollis, a beetle species
- Miaenia brevicollis, a beetle species
- Monosiga brevicollis, a choanoflagellate
