= Miaenia hirashimai =

Scientific classification
- Kingdom: Animalia
- Phylum: Arthropoda
- Class: Insecta
- Order: Coleoptera
- Suborder: Polyphaga
- Infraorder: Cucujiformia
- Family: Cerambycidae
- Genus: Miaenia
- Species: M. hirashimai

Binomial name
- Miaenia hirashimai (Samuelson, 1965)

Species of beetle

Miaenia hirashimai is a species of beetle in the family Cerambycidae. It was described by Samuelson in 1965.
