= Miaenia pulchella =

Scientific classification
- Kingdom: Animalia
- Phylum: Arthropoda
- Class: Insecta
- Order: Coleoptera
- Suborder: Polyphaga
- Infraorder: Cucujiformia
- Family: Cerambycidae
- Genus: Miaenia
- Species: M. pulchella

Binomial name
- Miaenia pulchella Heller, 1924

Species of beetle

Miaenia pulchella is a species of beetle in the family Cerambycidae.
