= Miaenia latia =

Scientific classification
- Kingdom: Animalia
- Phylum: Arthropoda
- Class: Insecta
- Order: Coleoptera
- Suborder: Polyphaga
- Infraorder: Cucujiformia
- Family: Cerambycidae
- Genus: Miaenia
- Species: M. latia

Binomial name
- Miaenia latia (Blair, 1940)

Species of beetle

Miaenia latia is a species of beetle in the family Cerambycidae. It was described by Blair in 1940.
