= Miaenia anoplos =

Scientific classification
- Kingdom: Animalia
- Phylum: Arthropoda
- Class: Insecta
- Order: Coleoptera
- Suborder: Polyphaga
- Infraorder: Cucujiformia
- Family: Cerambycidae
- Genus: Miaenia
- Species: M. anoplos

Binomial name
- Miaenia anoplos (Ohbayashi N., 1976)

Species of beetle

Miaenia anoplos is a species of beetle in the family Cerambycidae. It was described by Ohbayashi N. in 1976.
