= Miaenia fujiyamai =

Scientific classification
- Kingdom: Animalia
- Phylum: Arthropoda
- Clade: Pancrustacea
- Class: Insecta
- Order: Coleoptera
- Suborder: Polyphaga
- Infraorder: Cucujiformia
- Family: Cerambycidae
- Genus: Miaenia
- Species: M. fujiyamai

Binomial name
- Miaenia fujiyamai (Matsumura & Matsushita, 1933)

Synonyms
- Exocentrus fujiyamai Matsumura & Matsushita, 1933; Sciades fujiyamai (Matsumura & Matsushita, 1933); Exocentrus leiopodinus Matsushita, 1933

Species of beetle

Miaenia fujiyamai is a species of beetle in the family Cerambycidae. It was described by Shōnen Matsumura and Masaki Matsushita in 1933.
