= Miaenia woodlarkiana =

Scientific classification
- Kingdom: Animalia
- Phylum: Arthropoda
- Class: Insecta
- Order: Coleoptera
- Suborder: Polyphaga
- Infraorder: Cucujiformia
- Family: Cerambycidae
- Genus: Miaenia
- Species: M. woodlarkiana

Binomial name
- Miaenia woodlarkiana (Breuning, 1957)

Species of beetle

Miaenia woodlarkiana is a species of beetle in the family Cerambycidae. It was described by Breuning in 1957.
