= Miaenia rondoniana =

Scientific classification
- Kingdom: Animalia
- Phylum: Arthropoda
- Class: Insecta
- Order: Coleoptera
- Suborder: Polyphaga
- Infraorder: Cucujiformia
- Family: Cerambycidae
- Genus: Miaenia
- Species: M. rondoniana

Binomial name
- Miaenia rondoniana (Breuning, 1965)

Species of beetle

Miaenia rondoniana is a species of beetle in the family Cerambycidae. It was described by Breuning in 1965.
