= Miaenia elongata =

Scientific classification
- Kingdom: Animalia
- Phylum: Arthropoda
- Class: Insecta
- Order: Coleoptera
- Suborder: Polyphaga
- Infraorder: Cucujiformia
- Family: Cerambycidae
- Genus: Miaenia
- Species: M. elongata

Binomial name
- Miaenia elongata (Gressitt, 1951)

Species of beetle

Miaenia elongata is a species of beetle in the family Cerambycidae. It was described by Gressitt in 1951.
