= Miaenia minuta =

Scientific classification
- Kingdom: Animalia
- Phylum: Arthropoda
- Class: Insecta
- Order: Coleoptera
- Suborder: Polyphaga
- Infraorder: Cucujiformia
- Family: Cerambycidae
- Genus: Miaenia
- Species: M. minuta

Binomial name
- Miaenia minuta (Fisher, 1936)

Species of longhorn beetle

Miaenia minuta is a species of longhorn beetle in the family Cerambycidae. It was described by Fisher in 1936.
