= Miaenia insularis =

Scientific classification
- Kingdom: Animalia
- Phylum: Arthropoda
- Class: Insecta
- Order: Coleoptera
- Suborder: Polyphaga
- Infraorder: Cucujiformia
- Family: Cerambycidae
- Genus: Miaenia
- Species: M. insularis

Binomial name
- Miaenia insularis (Fisher, 1934)

Species of beetle

Miaenia insularis is a species of beetle in the family Cerambycidae. It was described by Fisher in 1934.
