= Miaenia tonsa =

Scientific classification
- Kingdom: Animalia
- Phylum: Arthropoda
- Class: Insecta
- Order: Coleoptera
- Suborder: Polyphaga
- Infraorder: Cucujiformia
- Family: Cerambycidae
- Genus: Miaenia
- Species: M. tonsa

Binomial name
- Miaenia tonsa (Bates, 1873)

Species of beetle

Miaenia tonsa is a species of beetle in the family Cerambycidae. It was described by Bates in 1873.
