= Miaenia inhirsuta =

Scientific classification
- Kingdom: Animalia
- Phylum: Arthropoda
- Class: Insecta
- Order: Coleoptera
- Suborder: Polyphaga
- Infraorder: Cucujiformia
- Family: Cerambycidae
- Genus: Miaenia
- Species: M. inhirsuta

Binomial name
- Miaenia inhirsuta (Pic, 1897)

Species of beetle

Miaenia inhirsuta is a species of beetle in the family Cerambycidae. It was described by Maurice Pic in 1897.
