= Miaenia subfasciata =

Scientific classification
- Kingdom: Animalia
- Phylum: Arthropoda
- Class: Insecta
- Order: Coleoptera
- Suborder: Polyphaga
- Infraorder: Cucujiformia
- Family: Cerambycidae
- Genus: Miaenia
- Species: M. subfasciata

Binomial name
- Miaenia subfasciata (Schwarzer, 1925)

Species of beetle

Miaenia subfasciata is a species of beetle in the family Cerambycidae. It was described by Schwarzer in 1925.
