= Miaenia subcylindrus =

Scientific classification
- Kingdom: Animalia
- Phylum: Arthropoda
- Class: Insecta
- Order: Coleoptera
- Suborder: Polyphaga
- Infraorder: Cucujiformia
- Family: Cerambycidae
- Genus: Miaenia
- Species: M. subcylindrus

Binomial name
- Miaenia subcylindrus (Gressitt, 1956)

Species of beetle

Miaenia subcylindrus is a species of beetle in the family Cerambycidae. It was described by Gressitt in 1956.
