= Miaenia cebuensis =

Scientific classification
- Kingdom: Animalia
- Phylum: Arthropoda
- Class: Insecta
- Order: Coleoptera
- Suborder: Polyphaga
- Infraorder: Cucujiformia
- Family: Cerambycidae
- Genus: Miaenia
- Species: M. cebuensis

Binomial name
- Miaenia cebuensis (Breuning, 1957)

Species of beetle

Miaenia cebuensis is a species of beetle in the family Cerambycidae. It was described by Breuning in 1957.
