= Miaenia nobuoi =

Scientific classification
- Kingdom: Animalia
- Phylum: Arthropoda
- Class: Insecta
- Order: Coleoptera
- Suborder: Polyphaga
- Infraorder: Cucujiformia
- Family: Cerambycidae
- Genus: Miaenia
- Species: M. nobuoi

Binomial name
- Miaenia nobuoi (Breuning & Ohbayashi, 1964)

Species of beetle

Miaenia nobuoi is a species of beetle in the family Cerambycidae. It was described by Stephan von Breuning and Ohbayashi in 1964.
