= Miaenia uniformis =

Scientific classification
- Kingdom: Animalia
- Phylum: Arthropoda
- Class: Insecta
- Order: Coleoptera
- Suborder: Polyphaga
- Infraorder: Cucujiformia
- Family: Cerambycidae
- Genus: Miaenia
- Species: M. uniformis

Binomial name
- Miaenia uniformis (Breuning, 1957)

Synonyms
- Aegocidnus (Miaena) uniformis Breuning, 1957; Miaena (Miaena) uniformis (Breuning, 1957); Sciades uniformis (Breuning, 1957)

Species of beetle

Miaenia uniformis is a species of beetle in the family Cerambycidae. It was described by Stephan von Breuning in 1957. It is known from Mailu Island, Papua New Guinea.

Miaenia uniformis measure 4.5 mm (0.18 in) in length.
