= Miaenia fasciata =

Scientific classification
- Kingdom: Animalia
- Phylum: Arthropoda
- Class: Insecta
- Order: Coleoptera
- Suborder: Polyphaga
- Infraorder: Cucujiformia
- Family: Cerambycidae
- Genus: Miaenia
- Species: M. fasciata

Binomial name
- Miaenia fasciata (Matsushita, 1943)

Species of beetle

Miaenia fasciata is a species of beetle in the family Cerambycidae. It was described by Matsushita in 1943.
