= Miaenia =

Scientific classification
- Domain: Eukaryota
- Kingdom: Animalia
- Phylum: Arthropoda
- Class: Insecta
- Order: Coleoptera
- Suborder: Polyphaga
- Infraorder: Cucujiformia
- Family: Cerambycidae
- Tribe: Acanthocinini
- Genus: Miaenia

Genus of beetles

Miaenia is a genus of beetles in the family Cerambycidae, containing the following species:

== Subgenus Acanthosciades ==
- Miaenia latia (Blair, 1940)
- Miaenia latispina (Gressitt, 1956)

== Subgenus Aegocidnus ==
- Miaenia binaluensis (Breuning, 1956)
- Miaenia cebuensis (Breuning, 1957)
- Miaenia costulata (Pascoe, 1864)
- Miaenia flavomaculata Fisher, 1925
- Miaenia grammica (Pascoe, 1864)
- Miaenia ignara (Pascoe, 1864)
- Miaenia insularis (Fisher, 1934)
- Miaenia jubata (Pascoe, 1864)
- Miaenia mindoroensis Breuning, 1957
- Miaenia variabilis Aurivillius, 1927

== Subgenus Estoliops ==
- Miaenia argentipleura (Gressitt, 1956)
- Miaenia aureopleura (Gressitt, 1956)
- Miaenia fasciata (Matsushita, 1943)
- Miaenia longicollis (Breuning & Ohbayashi, 1964)
- Miaenia sakishimana (Gressitt, 1951)

== Subgenus Granuuilmiaenia ==
- Miaenia granulicollis (Gressitt, 1938)

== Subgenus Indoaegocidnus ==
- Miaenia binhana (Pic, 1926)
- Miaenia ceylanica (Breuning, 1957)
- Miaenia gilmouri (Breuning, 1962)
- Miaenia hongkongensis Breuning, 1968
- Miaenia indica (Breuning, 1956)
- Miaenia inlineata (Pic, 1936)

== Subgenus Miaenia ==
- Miaenia andamanensis Breuning, 1957
- Miaenia brevicollis (Gressitt, 1951)
- Miaenia demarzi (Breuning, 1963)
- Miaenia doreyi (Breuning, 1963)
- Miaenia elongata (Gressitt, 1951)
- Miaenia hirashimai (Samuelson, 1965)
- Miaenia irrorata Pascoe, 1864
- Miaenia luzonica Breuning, 1959
- Miaenia maritima Tsherepanov, 1979
- Miaenia marmorea Pascoe, 1864
- Miaenia masbatensis Breuning, 1957
- Miaenia meridiana (Ohbayashi, 1941)
- Miaenia mindanaonis Breuning, 1957
- Miaenia minuta (Fisher, 1936)
- Miaenia nakanei (Hayashi, 1956)
- Miaenia papuensis (Breuning, 1963)
- Miaenia perversa (Pascoe, 1864)
- Miaenia pulchella (Heller, 1924)>
- Miaenia quadriplagiata (Breuning, 1958)
- Miaenia retrospinosa Breuning, 1963
- Miaenia rufula Fisher, 1925
- Miaenia samarensis Breuning, 1961
- Miaenia subfasciata (Schwarzer, 1925)
- Miaenia uniformis (Breuning, 1957)
- Miaenia variegata Fisher, 1925
- Miaenia woodlarkiana (Breuning, 1957)

== Subgenus Micronesiella ==
- Miaenia atollorum (Gressitt, 1956)
- Miaenia attenuata (Gressitt, 1956)
- Miaenia boharti (Gressitt, 1956)
- Miaenia esakii (Gressitt, 1956)
- Miaenia mariana (Gressitt, 1956)
- Miaenia palauicola (Gressitt, 1956)
- Miaenia saltatrix (Gressitt, 1956)
- Miaenia subcylindrus (Gressitt, 1956)
- Miaenia townesi (Gressitt, 1956)
- Miaenia versicolora (Gressitt, 1956)

== Subgenus Nonymoides ==
- Miaenia carolinensis (Blair, 1940)
- Miaenia subglabra (Gressitt, 1956)

== Subgenus Pomeranaegocidnus ==
- Miaenia neopomeriana (Breuning, 1957)
- Miaenia papuana (Breuning, 1957)

== Subgenus Pseudocidnus ==
- Miaenia anoplos (Ohbayashi N., 1976)
- Miaenia fujiyamai (Matsumura & Matsushita, 1933)
- Miaenia hirsuta (Ohbayashi N., 1976)
- Miaenia inhirsuta (Pic, 1897)
- Miaenia lanata (Ohbayashi N., 1976)
- Miaenia nobuoi (Breuning & Ohbayashi, 1964)
- Miaenia satoi (Ohbayashi N., 1976)
- Miaenia tonsa (Bates, 1873)
- Miaenia vagemarmorata (Breuning, 1957)

== Subgenus Sibuyomiaenis ==
- Miaenia sibuyanensis Fisher, 1925

== Subgenus Tonkinomiaenia ==
- Miaenia rondoniana (Breuning, 1965)
- Miaenia tonkinensis (Pic, 1944)

== Subgenus Truncatomiaenia ==
- Miaenia botelensis (Gressitt, 1951)
- Miaenia exigua (Gahan, 1900)
- Miaenia melanotis Pascoe, 1864
- Miaenia suffusa Pascoe, 1864
