= Miaenia meridiana =

Scientific classification
- Kingdom: Animalia
- Phylum: Arthropoda
- Class: Insecta
- Order: Coleoptera
- Suborder: Polyphaga
- Infraorder: Cucujiformia
- Family: Cerambycidae
- Genus: Miaenia
- Species: M. meridiana

Binomial name
- Miaenia meridiana (Ohbayashi, 1941)

Species of beetle

Miaenia meridiana is a species of beetle in the family Cerambycidae. It was described by Ohbayashi in 1941.
