= Miaenia maritima =

Scientific classification
- Kingdom: Animalia
- Phylum: Arthropoda
- Class: Insecta
- Order: Coleoptera
- Suborder: Polyphaga
- Infraorder: Cucujiformia
- Family: Cerambycidae
- Genus: Miaenia
- Species: M. maritima

Binomial name
- Miaenia maritima Tsherepanov, 1979

Species of beetle

Miaenia maritima is a species of beetle in the family Cerambycidae. It was described by Tsherepanov in 1979.
