= Miaenia inlineata =

Scientific classification
- Kingdom: Animalia
- Phylum: Arthropoda
- Class: Insecta
- Order: Coleoptera
- Suborder: Polyphaga
- Infraorder: Cucujiformia
- Family: Cerambycidae
- Genus: Miaenia
- Species: M. inlineata

Binomial name
- Miaenia inlineata (Pic, 1936)

Species of beetle

Miaenia inlineata is a species of beetle in the family Cerambycidae. It was described by Maurice Pic in 1936.
