= Miaenia luzonica =

Scientific classification
- Kingdom: Animalia
- Phylum: Arthropoda
- Class: Insecta
- Order: Coleoptera
- Suborder: Polyphaga
- Infraorder: Cucujiformia
- Family: Cerambycidae
- Genus: Miaenia
- Species: M. luzonica

Binomial name
- Miaenia luzonica Breuning, 1959

Species of beetle

Miaenia luzonica is a species of beetle in the family Cerambycidae. It was described by Breuning in 1959.
