= Miaenia jubata =

Scientific classification
- Kingdom: Animalia
- Phylum: Arthropoda
- Class: Insecta
- Order: Coleoptera
- Suborder: Polyphaga
- Infraorder: Cucujiformia
- Family: Cerambycidae
- Genus: Miaenia
- Species: M. jubata

Binomial name
- Miaenia jubata (Pascoe, 1864)

Species of beetle

Miaenia jubata is a species of beetle in the family Cerambycidae. It was described by Pascoe in 1864.
