= Miaenia exigua =

Scientific classification
- Kingdom: Animalia
- Phylum: Arthropoda
- Class: Insecta
- Order: Coleoptera
- Suborder: Polyphaga
- Infraorder: Cucujiformia
- Family: Cerambycidae
- Genus: Miaenia
- Species: M. exigua

Binomial name
- Miaenia exigua (Gahan, 1900)

Species of beetle

Miaenia exigua is a species of beetle in the family Cerambycidae. It was described by Gahan in 1900.
