= Miaenia irrorata =

Scientific classification
- Kingdom: Animalia
- Phylum: Arthropoda
- Class: Insecta
- Order: Coleoptera
- Suborder: Polyphaga
- Infraorder: Cucujiformia
- Family: Cerambycidae
- Genus: Miaenia
- Species: M. irrorata

Binomial name
- Miaenia irrorata Pascoe, 1864

Species of beetle

Miaenia irrorata is a species of beetle in the family Cerambycidae. It was described by Pascoe in 1864.
