= Mordellistena grammica =

Scientific classification
- Domain: Eukaryota
- Kingdom: Animalia
- Phylum: Arthropoda
- Class: Insecta
- Order: Coleoptera
- Suborder: Polyphaga
- Infraorder: Cucujiformia
- Family: Mordellidae
- Genus: Mordellistena
- Species: M. grammica

Binomial name
- Mordellistena grammica LeConte, 1862

Species of beetle

Mordellistena grammica is a beetle in the genus Mordellistena of the family Mordellidae. It was described in 1862 by John Lawrence LeConte.
