= Pselaphostena calcarata =

Scientific classification
- Domain: Eukaryota
- Kingdom: Animalia
- Phylum: Arthropoda
- Class: Insecta
- Order: Coleoptera
- Suborder: Polyphaga
- Infraorder: Cucujiformia
- Family: Mordellidae
- Genus: Pselaphostena
- Species: P. calcarata

Binomial name
- Pselaphostena calcarata Franciscolo, 1957

Species of beetle

Pselaphostena calcarata is a beetle in the genus Pselaphostena of the family Mordellidae. It was described in 1957 by Franciscolo.
