= Pselaphostena antennata =

Scientific classification
- Domain: Eukaryota
- Kingdom: Animalia
- Phylum: Arthropoda
- Class: Insecta
- Order: Coleoptera
- Suborder: Polyphaga
- Infraorder: Cucujiformia
- Family: Mordellidae
- Genus: Pselaphostena
- Species: P. antennata

Binomial name
- Pselaphostena antennata Franciscolo, 1951

Species of beetle

Pselaphostena antennata is a beetle in the genus Pselaphostena of the family Mordellidae. It was described in 1951 by Franciscolo.
