= Brodskyella angustata =

Scientific classification
- Kingdom: Animalia
- Phylum: Arthropoda
- Class: Insecta
- Order: Coleoptera
- Suborder: Polyphaga
- Infraorder: Cucujiformia
- Family: Mordellidae
- Genus: Brodskyella
- Species: B. angustata

Binomial name
- Brodskyella angustata (Píc, 1923)

Synonyms
- Stenalia angustata Píc, 1923

Species of beetle

Brodskyella angustata is a beetle in the genus Brodskyella of the family Mordellidae. It was described in 1923 by Píc.
