= Stenaliodes =

Scientific classification
- Domain: Eukaryota
- Kingdom: Animalia
- Phylum: Arthropoda
- Class: Insecta
- Order: Coleoptera
- Suborder: Polyphaga
- Infraorder: Cucujiformia
- Family: Mordellidae
- Tribe: Stenaliini
- Genus: Stenaliodes; Franciscolo, 1956

Genus of beetles

Stenaliodes is a genus of tumbling flower beetles in the family Mordellidae, known from Zimbabwe.
