= Stenaliini =

Scientific classification
- Domain: Eukaryota
- Kingdom: Animalia
- Phylum: Arthropoda
- Class: Insecta
- Order: Coleoptera
- Suborder: Polyphaga
- Infraorder: Cucujiformia
- Family: Mordellidae
- Subfamily: Mordellinae
- Tribe: Stenaliini; Franciscolo, 1956

Tribe of beetles

The Stenaliini are a tribe of beetles in the family Mordellidae.

== Genera ==
- Brodskyella Horák, 1989
- Pselaphostena Franciscolo, 1950
- Stenalia Mulsant, 1856
- Stenaliodes Franciscolo, 1956
