= Brodskyella holzschuhi =

Scientific classification
- Kingdom: Animalia
- Phylum: Arthropoda
- Class: Insecta
- Order: Coleoptera
- Suborder: Polyphaga
- Infraorder: Cucujiformia
- Family: Mordellidae
- Genus: Brodskyella
- Species: B. holzschuhi

Binomial name
- Brodskyella holzschuhi Horák, 1989

Species of beetle

Brodskyella holzschuhi is a beetle in the genus Brodskyella of the family Mordellidae. It was described in 1989 by Horák.
