= Brodskyella =

Scientific classification
- Kingdom: Animalia
- Phylum: Arthropoda
- Class: Insecta
- Order: Coleoptera
- Suborder: Polyphaga
- Infraorder: Cucujiformia
- Family: Mordellidae
- Subfamily: Mordellinae
- Tribe: Stenaliini
- Genus: Brodskyella; Horák, 1989

Genus of beetles

Brodskyella is a genus of tumbling flower beetles in the family Mordellidae. There are about four described species in Brodskyella.

== Species ==
These four species belong to the genus Brodskyella:

- Brodskyella angustata (Pic, 1923)
- Brodskyella holzschuhi Horák, 1989
- Brodskyella konvickai Ruzzier & Yeshwanth, 2019
- Brodskyella viraktamathi Ruzzier & Yeshwanth, 2019
