= Pselaphostena =

Scientific classification
- Domain: Eukaryota
- Kingdom: Animalia
- Phylum: Arthropoda
- Class: Insecta
- Order: Coleoptera
- Suborder: Polyphaga
- Infraorder: Cucujiformia
- Family: Mordellidae
- Subfamily: Mordellinae
- Tribe: Stenaliini
- Genus: Pselaphostena; Franciscolo, 1950

Genus of beetles

Pselaphostena is a genus of tumbling flower beetles in the family Mordellidae, found in the Afrotropics.

== Species ==
The following species are members of the genus Pselaphostena.

- Pselaphostena antennata Franciscolo, 1951
- Pselaphostena arnoldi Franciscolo, 1950
- Pselaphostena calcarata Franciscolo, 1957
- Pselaphostena diversicornis Franciscolo, 1951
- Pselaphostena fulvosignata Franciscolo, 1957
- Pselaphostena longepalpalpis Franciscolo, 1951
- Pselaphostena occidentalis Franciscolo, 1957
- Pselaphostena praetoriana Franciscolo, 1951
- Pselaphostena pulchripennis Franciscolo, 1957
- Pselaphostena rhodesiensis Franciscolo, 1951
- Pselaphostena vansoni Franciscolo, 1951
