= Pselaphostena arnoldi =

Scientific classification
- Domain: Eukaryota
- Kingdom: Animalia
- Phylum: Arthropoda
- Class: Insecta
- Order: Coleoptera
- Suborder: Polyphaga
- Infraorder: Cucujiformia
- Family: Mordellidae
- Genus: Pselaphostena
- Species: P. arnoldi

Binomial name
- Pselaphostena arnoldi Franciscolo, 1950

Species of beetle

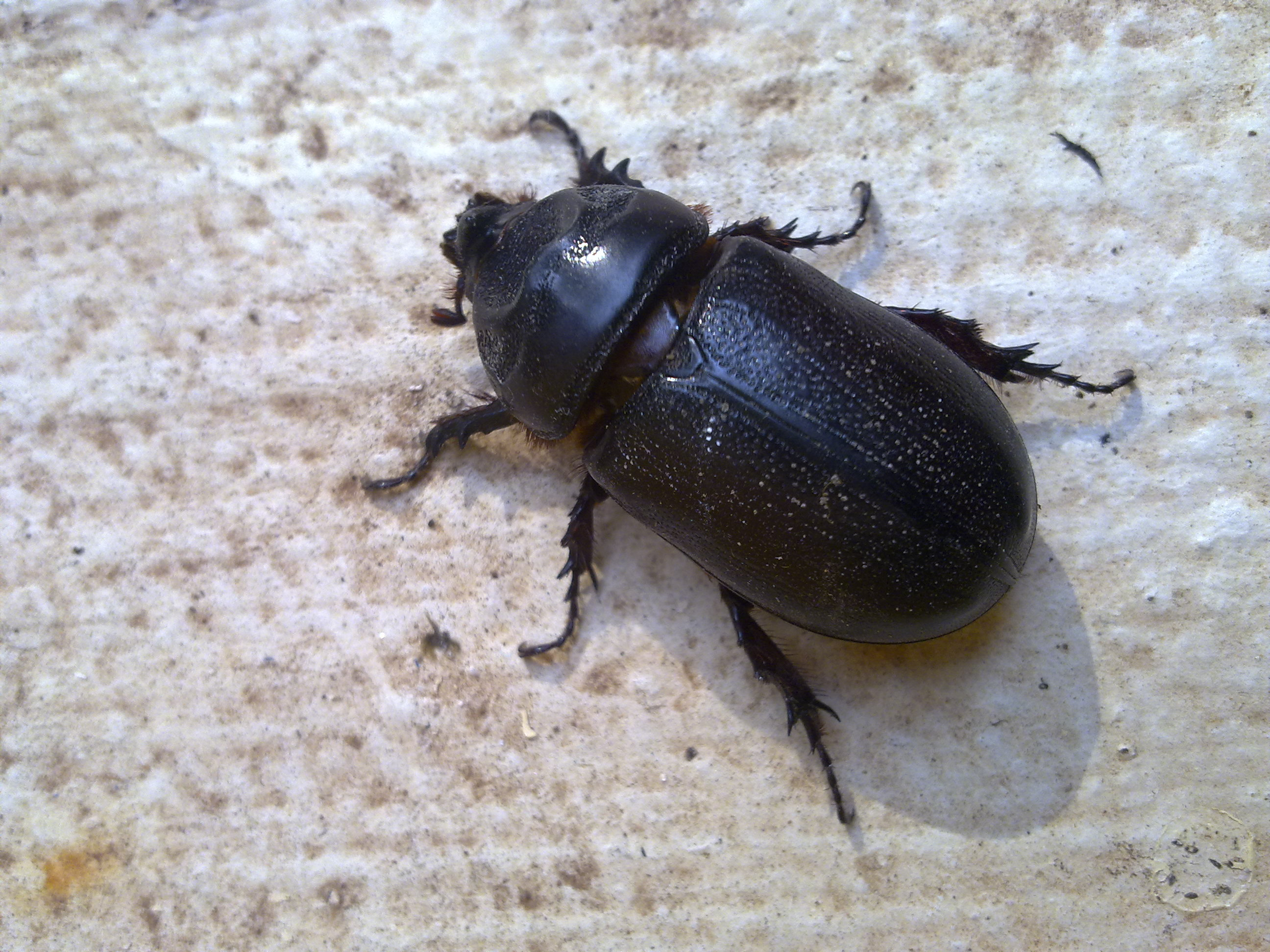
Pselaphostena arnoldi is often compared to the rhinoceros beetle (see above)

Pselaphostena arnoldi is a beetle in the genus Pselaphostena of the family Mordellidae. It was described in 1950 by Franciscolo.
