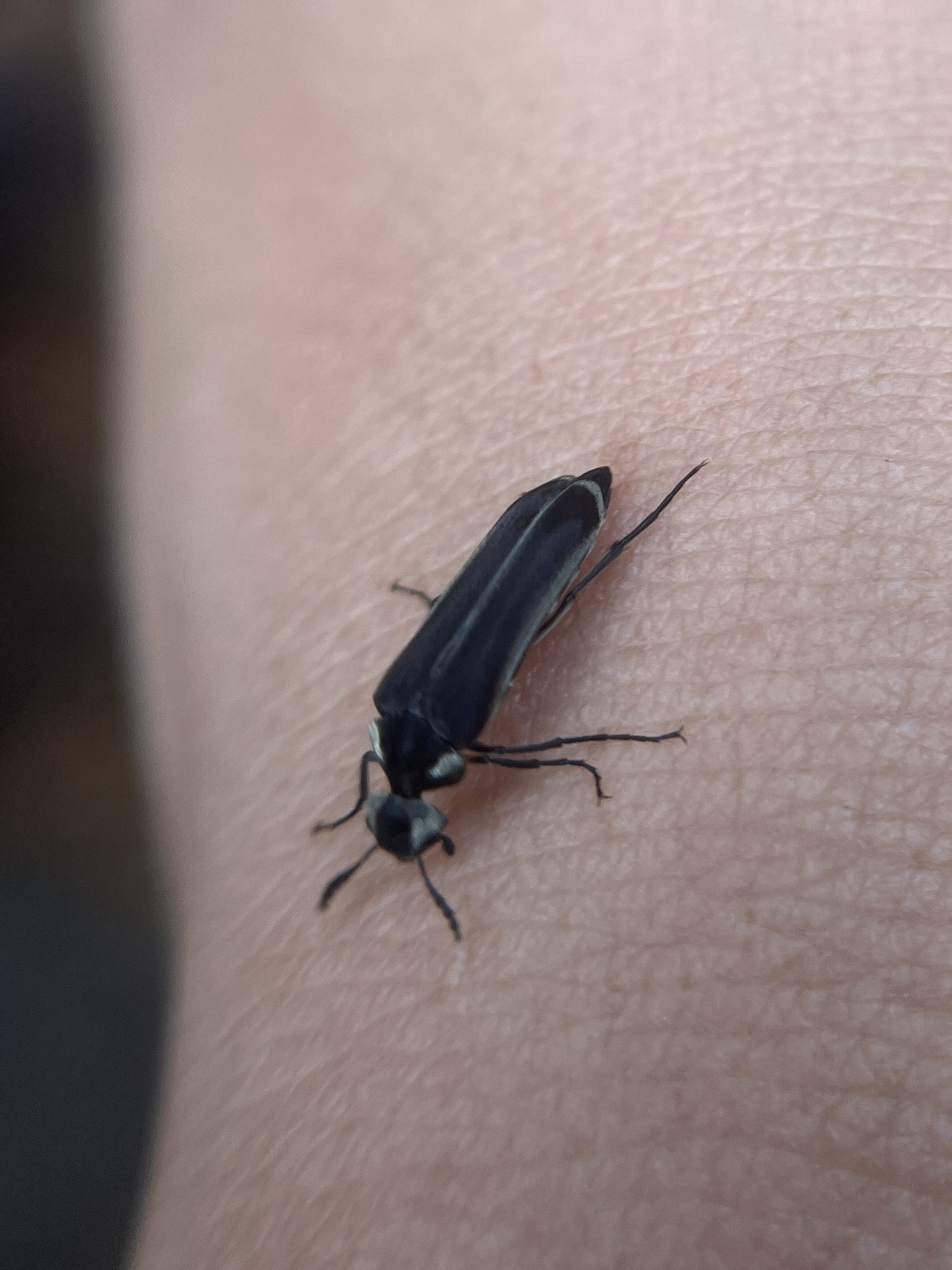
- Calycina, Colombia

Scientific classification
- Kingdom: Animalia
- Phylum: Arthropoda
- Class: Insecta
- Order: Coleoptera
- Suborder: Polyphaga
- Infraorder: Cucujiformia
- Family: Mordellidae
- Subfamily: Mordellinae
- Tribe: Mordellini
- Genus: Calycina; Blair, 1922

Synonyms
- Calycella Blair, 1922

= Calycina (beetle) =

Genus of beetles

Calycina is a genus of tumbling flower beetles in the family Mordellidae. There are at least eight described species in Calycina.

== Species ==
These species belong to the genus Calycina:

- Calycina guineensis (Blair, 1922) (western Africa)
- Calycina horaki Ruzzier & Kovalev, 2016 (temperate Asia)
- Calycina major Nomura, 1967 (temperate Asia)
- Calycina nigriceps (Blair, 1922) (Malaysia)
- Calycina nigroapicalis Nomura, 1967 (temperate Asia)
- Calycina palpalis (Blair, 1922)
- Calycina poggii Ruzzier, 2013
- Calycina sericeobrunnea (Blair, 1915) (southeast Asia)
