= Calycina nigriceps =

Scientific classification
- Kingdom: Animalia
- Phylum: Arthropoda
- Class: Insecta
- Order: Coleoptera
- Suborder: Polyphaga
- Infraorder: Cucujiformia
- Family: Mordellidae
- Genus: Calycina
- Species: C. nigriceps

Binomial name
- Calycina nigriceps (Blair, 1922)

Synonyms
- Calycella nigriceps Blair, 1922

Species of beetle

Calycina nigriceps is a species of beetle in the genus Calycina. It is found in Malaysia.
