= Calycina sericeobrunnea =

Scientific classification
- Domain: Eukaryota
- Kingdom: Animalia
- Phylum: Arthropoda
- Class: Insecta
- Order: Coleoptera
- Suborder: Polyphaga
- Infraorder: Cucujiformia
- Family: Mordellidae
- Genus: Calycina
- Species: C. sericeobrunnea

Binomial name
- Calycina sericeobrunnea (Blair, 1915)

Synonyms
- Calycella sericeobrunnea Blair, 1922; Mordella sericeobrunnea Blair, 1915

Species of beetle

Calycina sericeobrunnea is a species of tumbling flower beetles in the family Mordellidae, found in Southeast Asia.
