= Calycina horaki =

Scientific classification
- Domain: Eukaryota
- Kingdom: Animalia
- Phylum: Arthropoda
- Class: Insecta
- Order: Coleoptera
- Suborder: Polyphaga
- Infraorder: Cucujiformia
- Family: Mordellidae
- Genus: Calycina
- Species: C. horaki

Binomial name
- Calycina horaki Ruzzier & Kovalev, 2016

Species of beetle

Calycina horaki is a species of beetle in the genus Calycina. It was described Ruzzier and Kovalev in 2016.
