= Calycina palpalis =

Scientific classification
- Domain: Eukaryota
- Kingdom: Animalia
- Phylum: Arthropoda
- Class: Insecta
- Order: Coleoptera
- Suborder: Polyphaga
- Infraorder: Cucujiformia
- Family: Mordellidae
- Genus: Calycina
- Species: C. palpalis

Binomial name
- Calycina palpalis (Blair, 1922)

Synonyms
- Calycella palpalis Blair, 1922

Species of beetle

Calycina palpalis is a species of beetle in the genus Calycina. It was described in 1922.
