= Calycina guineensis =

Scientific classification
- Kingdom: Animalia
- Phylum: Arthropoda
- Class: Insecta
- Order: Coleoptera
- Suborder: Polyphaga
- Infraorder: Cucujiformia
- Family: Mordellidae
- Genus: Calycina
- Species: C. guineensis

Binomial name
- Calycina guineensis (Blair, 1922)

Synonyms
- Calycella guineensis Blair, 1922; Calycella impressa Pic, 1931; Calycina impressa Ermisch, 1949

Species of beetle

Calycina guineensis is a species of tumbling flower beetles in the family Mordellidae, found in western Africa.
