= Calycina nigroapicalis =

Scientific classification
- Domain: Eukaryota
- Kingdom: Animalia
- Phylum: Arthropoda
- Class: Insecta
- Order: Coleoptera
- Suborder: Polyphaga
- Infraorder: Cucujiformia
- Family: Mordellidae
- Genus: Calycina
- Species: C. nigroapicalis

Binomial name
- Calycina nigroapicalis Nomura, 1967

Species of beetle

Calycina nigroapicalis is a species of beetle in the genus Calycina. It was described in 1967.
