= Neocurtimorda sumatrana =

Scientific classification
- Kingdom: Animalia
- Phylum: Arthropoda
- Class: Insecta
- Order: Coleoptera
- Suborder: Polyphaga
- Infraorder: Cucujiformia
- Family: Mordellidae
- Genus: Neocurtimorda
- Species: N. sumatrana

Binomial name
- Neocurtimorda sumatrana (Pic,1929)

Synonyms
- Mordella sumatrana Pic, 1929; Mordella albosuturalis Pic, 1927 (not Liljeblad, 1922); Mordella niasensis Píc, 1941

Species of beetle

Neocurtimorda sumatrana is a species of beetle in the family Mordellidae.
