= Neocurtimorda conformis =

Scientific classification
- Kingdom: Animalia
- Phylum: Arthropoda
- Class: Insecta
- Order: Coleoptera
- Suborder: Polyphaga
- Infraorder: Cucujiformia
- Family: Mordellidae
- Genus: Neocurtimorda
- Species: N. conformis

Binomial name
- Neocurtimorda conformis Franciscolo, 1953

Species of beetle

Neocurtimorda conformis is a species of beetle in the genus Neocurtimorda of the family Mordellidae.
