= Neocurtimorda =

Scientific classification
- Kingdom: Animalia
- Phylum: Arthropoda
- Class: Insecta
- Order: Coleoptera
- Suborder: Polyphaga
- Infraorder: Cucujiformia
- Superfamily: Tenebrionoidea
- Family: Mordellidae
- Genus: Neocurtimorda; Franciscolo, 1949
- Species: N. convexa

Binomial name
- Neocurtimorda convexa Franciscolo, 1949

Genus of beetles

Neocurtimorda is a genus of tumbling flower beetles in the family Mordellidae.

== Species ==
The following species are members of the genus Neocurtimorda:

- Neocurtimorda conformis Franciscolo, 1953
- Neocurtimorda convexa Franciscolo, 1950
- Neocurtimorda distigma Franciscolo, 1955
- Neocurtimorda lugubris (Fahraeus, 1870)
- Neocurtimorda monostigma Franciscolo, 1953
- Neocurtimorda mordelloides Franciscolo, 1953
- Neocurtimorda perpusilla Franciscolo, 1953
- Neocurtimorda picicornis Franciscolo, 1953
- Neocurtimorda rufipalpis Franciscolo, 1953
- Neocurtimorda sexmaculata Franciscolo, 1953
- Neocurtimorda sumatrana (Pic,1929)
