= Mordellistena rhenana =

Scientific classification
- Domain: Eukaryota
- Kingdom: Animalia
- Phylum: Arthropoda
- Class: Insecta
- Order: Coleoptera
- Suborder: Polyphaga
- Infraorder: Cucujiformia
- Family: Mordellidae
- Genus: Mordellistena
- Species: M. rhenana

Binomial name
- Mordellistena rhenana Ermisch, 1956

Species of beetle

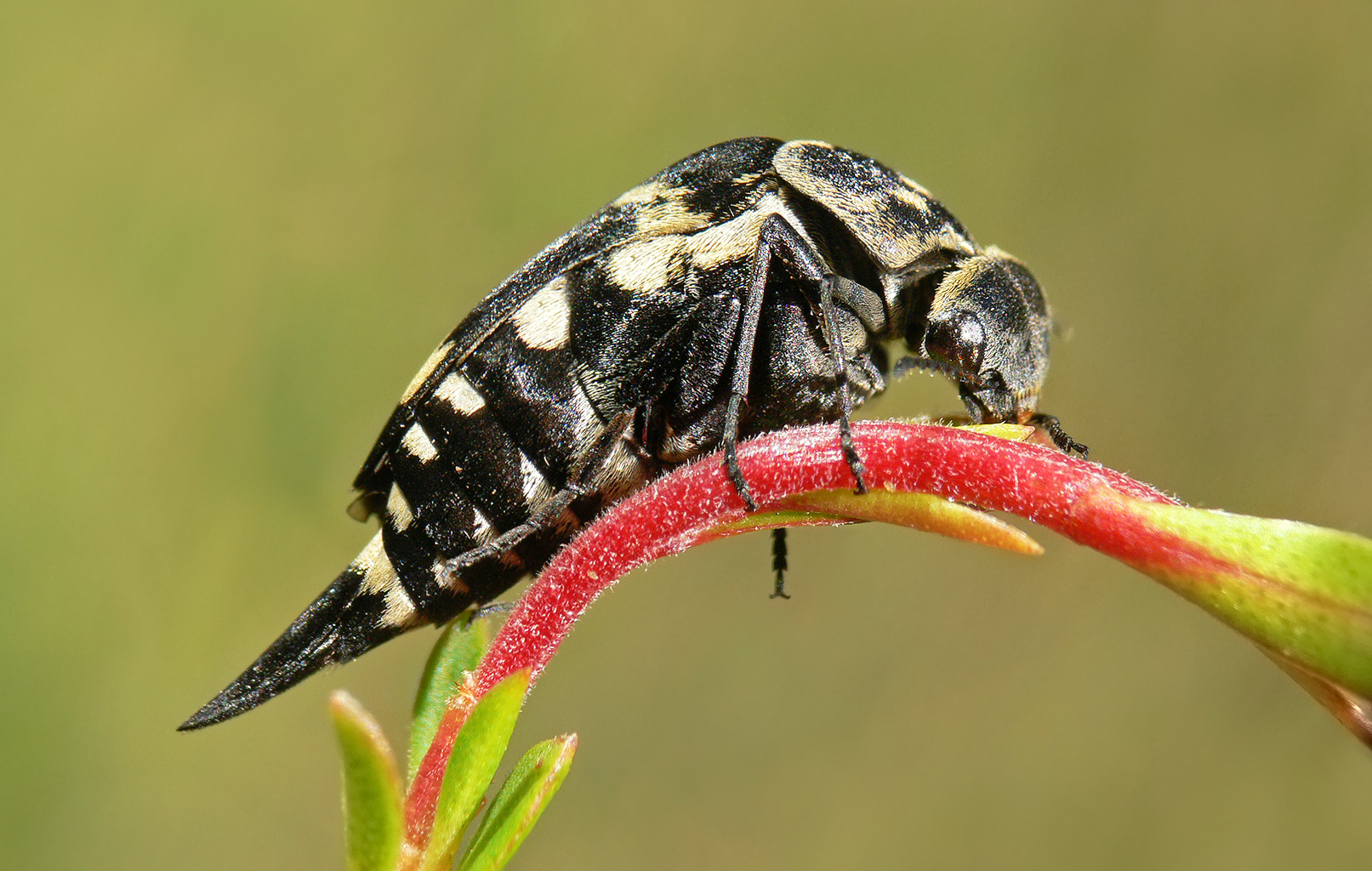
Pintail beetle Family Mordellidae

Mordellistena rhenana is a species of beetle in the genus Mordellistena of the family Mordellidae. It was described by Ermisch in 1956.
