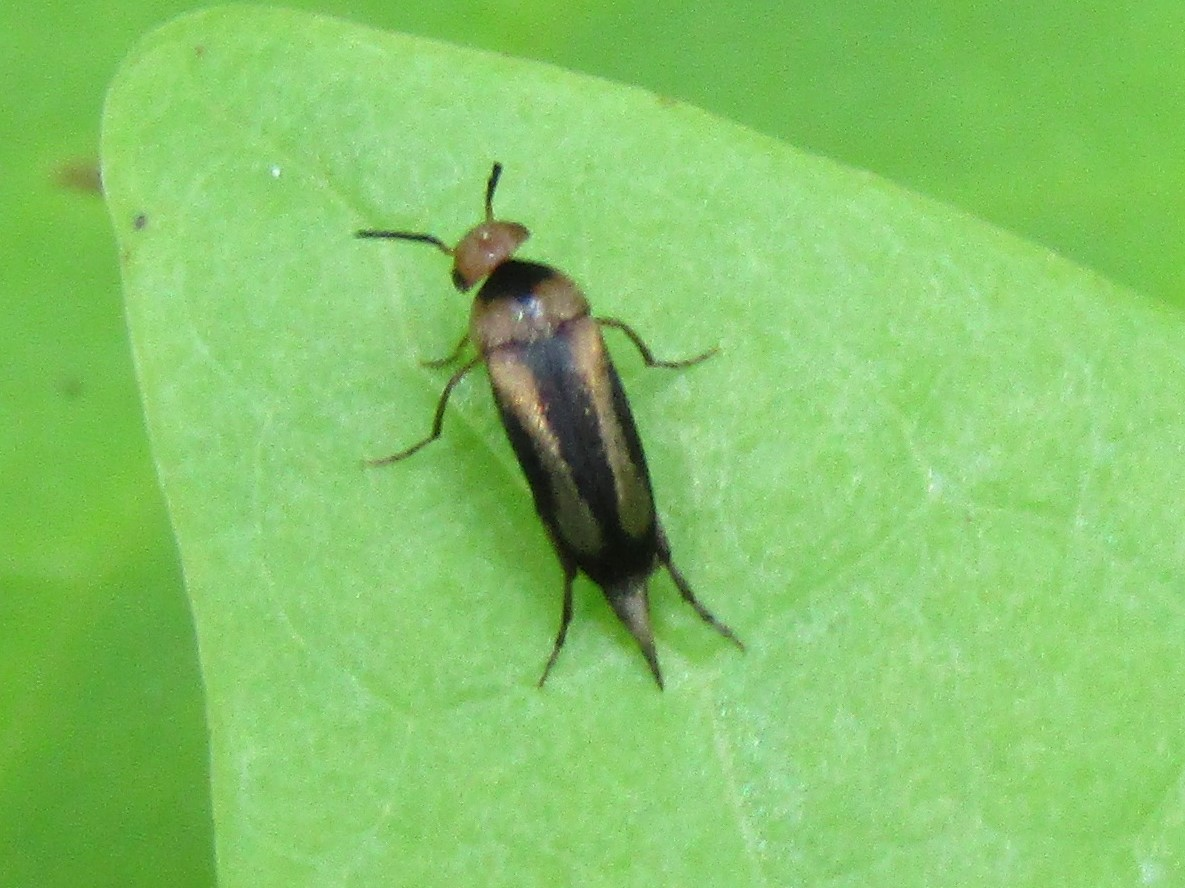

Scientific classification
- Domain: Eukaryota
- Kingdom: Animalia
- Phylum: Arthropoda
- Class: Insecta
- Order: Coleoptera
- Suborder: Polyphaga
- Infraorder: Cucujiformia
- Family: Mordellidae
- Genus: Mordellistena
- Species: M. attenuata

Binomial name
- Mordellistena attenuata (Say, 1824)

Synonyms
- Mordella attenuata Say, 1826; Mordellistena vittigera LeConte, 1862

= Mordellistena attenuata =

Species of beetle

Mordellistena attenuata is a species of beetle in the family Mordellidae. It is in the genus Mordellistena. It was described in 1824 by Thomas Say.
