= Rolcikomorda rufomaculata =

Scientific classification
- Kingdom: Animalia
- Phylum: Arthropoda
- Class: Insecta
- Order: Coleoptera
- Suborder: Polyphaga
- Infraorder: Cucujiformia
- Family: Mordellidae
- Subfamily: Mordellinae
- Tribe: Mordellistenini
- Genus: Rolcikomorda
- Species: R. rufomaculata

Binomial name
- Rolcikomorda rufomaculata (Pic, 1917)

Synonyms
- Mordellistena rufomaculata Píc, 1917

Species of beetles

Rolcikomorda rufomaculata is a species of tumbling flower beetle in the family Mordellidae, found in Madagascar.
