= Rolcikomorda bicoloripyga =

Scientific classification
- Kingdom: Animalia
- Phylum: Arthropoda
- Class: Insecta
- Order: Coleoptera
- Suborder: Polyphaga
- Infraorder: Cucujiformia
- Family: Mordellidae
- Subfamily: Mordellinae
- Tribe: Mordellistenini
- Genus: Rolcikomorda
- Species: R. bicoloripyga

Binomial name
- Rolcikomorda bicoloripyga (Pic, 1937)

Synonyms
- Mordellistena bicoloripyga Píc, 1937

Species of beetles

Rolcikomorda bicoloripyga is a species of tumbling flower beetle in the family Mordellidae, found in Madagascar.
