= Rolcikomorda =

Scientific classification
- Kingdom: Animalia
- Phylum: Arthropoda
- Class: Insecta
- Order: Coleoptera
- Suborder: Polyphaga
- Infraorder: Cucujiformia
- Family: Mordellidae
- Subfamily: Mordellinae
- Tribe: Mordellistenini
- Genus: Rolcikomorda; Horak, 2008

Synonyms
- Hauckina Horák, 2008

Genus of beetles

Rolcikomorda is a genus of tumbling flower beetles in the family Mordellidae, found in Madagascar.

== Species ==
These species are members of the genus Rolcikomorda.

- Rolcikomorda bicoloripyga (Pic, 1937)
- Rolcikomorda diegosa (Pic, 1917)
- Rolcikomorda imerina Horák, 2008
- Rolcikomorda rufomaculata (Pic, 1917)
