= Mordellistena goetzi =

Scientific classification
- Domain: Eukaryota
- Kingdom: Animalia
- Phylum: Arthropoda
- Class: Insecta
- Order: Coleoptera
- Suborder: Polyphaga
- Infraorder: Cucujiformia
- Family: Mordellidae
- Genus: Mordellistena
- Species: M. goetzi

Binomial name
- Mordellistena goetzi Ermisch, 1969

Species of beetle

Mordellistena goetzi is a species of beetle belonging to the family Mordellidae, which is commonly known as tumbling flower beetles. These beetles are small in size, typically measuring between 2 and 6 millimeters in length, and are characterized by their narrow and elongated bodies.

Mordellistena goetzi is found in various parts of Europe, including Germany, France, Italy, and Austria. These beetles can often be found in meadows, gardens, and other areas with abundant flowering plants, as they feed on nectar and pollen.

Like other members of the Mordellidae family, Mordellistena goetzi is capable of a unique form of locomotion known as "tumbling," in which it tucks its head and front legs in and rolls forward, using its hind legs to propel itself. This tumbling behavior is used as a defense mechanism against potential predators.

Mordellistena goetzi is just one of over 1,500 species of tumbling flower beetles found throughout the world, and researchers continue to study these fascinating insects to learn more about their behavior, ecology, and evolutionary history.
