= Mordellistena parvuliformis =

Scientific classification
- Domain: Eukaryota
- Kingdom: Animalia
- Phylum: Arthropoda
- Class: Insecta
- Order: Coleoptera
- Suborder: Polyphaga
- Infraorder: Cucujiformia
- Family: Mordellidae
- Genus: Mordellistena
- Species: M. parvuliformis

Binomial name
- Mordellistena parvuliformis Stshegoleva-Barovskaya, 1930

Species of beetle

Mordellistena parvuliformis, sometimes called the sunflower tumbling beetle, is a species of beetle in the genus Mordellistena of the family Mordellidae. It was described by Stshegoleva-Barovskaya in 1930. These larvae are known as pests of sunflower and hemp crops in some regions, particularly in Russia and Ukraine. However, the impacts are believed to be insignificant. The larvae grow up to 9.5 millimetres (0.37 in) long. Adults grow between 2.5 and 3.3 millimetres (0.098 and 0.130 in) long, and are black in colour.
