= Mordellistena dieckmanni =

Scientific classification
- Domain: Eukaryota
- Kingdom: Animalia
- Phylum: Arthropoda
- Class: Insecta
- Order: Coleoptera
- Suborder: Polyphaga
- Infraorder: Cucujiformia
- Family: Mordellidae
- Genus: Mordellistena
- Species: M. dieckmanni

Binomial name
- Mordellistena dieckmanni Ermisch, 1963

Species of beetle

Mordellistena dieckmanni is a species of beetle in the genus Mordellistena of the family Mordellidae. It was described in 1963 by Ermisch. and can be found in such European countries as Austria, Bulgaria, Croatia, Finland, France, Germany, Greece, Hungary, Poland, Slovakia, Slovenia and Switzerland.
