= Mordellistena angustiformis =

Scientific classification
- Kingdom: Animalia
- Phylum: Arthropoda
- Clade: Pancrustacea
- Class: Insecta
- Order: Coleoptera
- Suborder: Polyphaga
- Infraorder: Cucujiformia
- Family: Mordellidae
- Genus: Mordellistena
- Species: M. angustiformis

Binomial name
- Mordellistena angustiformis Ray, 1937

Species of beetle

Mordellistena angustiformis is a species of beetle in the family Mordellidae. It was described in 1937 by Eugene Ray from Puerto Rico.

This beetle measures 1.85 mm (0.073 in) in length, or 2.45 mm (0.096 in) when including the anal stylus. The antennae are 0.5 mm (0.020 in) long.
