= Mordellistena ephippium =

Scientific classification
- Kingdom: Animalia
- Phylum: Arthropoda
- Clade: Pancrustacea
- Class: Insecta
- Order: Coleoptera
- Suborder: Polyphaga
- Infraorder: Cucujiformia
- Family: Mordellidae
- Genus: Mordellistena
- Species: M. ephippium

Binomial name
- Mordellistena ephippium Ray, 1937

Species of beetle

Mordellistena ephippium is a species of beetle in the family Mordellidae. It was described in 1937 by Eugene Ray from Puerto Rico.

This beetle measures 2.25 mm (0.089 in) in length, or 3.25 mm (0.128 in) when including the anal stylus. The antennae are 0.8 mm (0.031 in) long.
