= Mordellistena lineata =

Scientific classification
- Kingdom: Animalia
- Phylum: Arthropoda
- Clade: Pancrustacea
- Class: Insecta
- Order: Coleoptera
- Suborder: Polyphaga
- Infraorder: Cucujiformia
- Family: Mordellidae
- Genus: Mordellistena
- Species: M. lineata

Binomial name
- Mordellistena lineata Ray, 1937

Species of beetle

Mordellistena lineata is a species of beetle in the family Mordellidae. It was described in 1937 by Eugene Ray from Puerto Rico.

This beetle measures 2.1 mm (0.083 in) in length, or 2.9 mm (0.11 in) when including the anal stylus. The antennae are 0.8 mm (0.031 in) long.
