= Mordellistena varietas =

Scientific classification
- Kingdom: Animalia
- Phylum: Arthropoda
- Clade: Pancrustacea
- Class: Insecta
- Order: Coleoptera
- Suborder: Polyphaga
- Infraorder: Cucujiformia
- Family: Mordellidae
- Genus: Mordellistena
- Species: M. varietas

Binomial name
- Mordellistena varietas Ray, 1937

Species of beetle

Mordellistena varietas is a species of beetle in the family Mordellidae. It was described in 1937 by Eugene Ray from Puerto Rico.

This beetle measures 2.8 mm (0.11 in) in length, or 3.9 mm (0.15 in) when including the anal stylus. The antennae are 0.85 mm (0.033 in) long.
