= Mordellistena dalmatica =

Scientific classification
- Domain: Eukaryota
- Kingdom: Animalia
- Phylum: Arthropoda
- Class: Insecta
- Order: Coleoptera
- Suborder: Polyphaga
- Infraorder: Cucujiformia
- Family: Mordellidae
- Genus: Mordellistena
- Species: M. dalmatica

Binomial name
- Mordellistena dalmatica Ermisch, 1956

Species of beetle

Mordellistena dalmatica is a species of beetle in the family Mordellidae. It is in the genus Mordellistena. It was discovered in 1956 and can be found in such European countries as Austria, Bulgaria, Czech Republic, Hungary, Italy, Slovakia, and most states of former Yugoslavia.
