= Mordellistena purpurascens =

Scientific classification
- Domain: Eukaryota
- Kingdom: Animalia
- Phylum: Arthropoda
- Class: Insecta
- Order: Coleoptera
- Suborder: Polyphaga
- Infraorder: Cucujiformia
- Family: Mordellidae
- Genus: Mordellistena
- Species: M. purpurascens

Binomial name
- Mordellistena purpurascens Costa, 1854

Species of beetle

Mordellistena purpurascens is a species of beetle in the genus Mordellistena of the family Mordellidae. It was described by Costa in 1854 and can be found in such countries as Croatia, France, Italy, Spain and on islands such as Corsica and Sicily.
