= Mordellistena paraintersecta =

Scientific classification
- Domain: Eukaryota
- Kingdom: Animalia
- Phylum: Arthropoda
- Class: Insecta
- Order: Coleoptera
- Suborder: Polyphaga
- Infraorder: Cucujiformia
- Family: Mordellidae
- Genus: Mordellistena
- Species: M. paraintersecta

Binomial name
- Mordellistena paraintersecta Ermisch, 1965

Species of beetle

Mordellistena paraintersecta is a species of beetle in the genus Mordellistena of the family Mordellidae. It was described by Ermisch in 1965 and can be found in countries such as Greece, Hungary, southern part of Russia and Near East.
