= Mordellistena nigritarsis =

Scientific classification
- Domain: Eukaryota
- Kingdom: Animalia
- Phylum: Arthropoda
- Class: Insecta
- Order: Coleoptera
- Suborder: Polyphaga
- Infraorder: Cucujiformia
- Family: Mordellidae
- Genus: Mordellistena
- Species: M. nigritarsis

Binomial name
- Mordellistena nigritarsis Horák, 1996

Species of beetle

Mordellistena nigritarsis is a species of beetle in the genus Mordellistena of the family Mordellidae. It was described by Jan Horák in 1996, and can be found in such countries as Czech Republic, Germany, Slovakia and Near East.
