= Mordellistena atrogemellata =

Scientific classification
- Kingdom: Animalia
- Phylum: Arthropoda
- Clade: Pancrustacea
- Class: Insecta
- Order: Coleoptera
- Suborder: Polyphaga
- Infraorder: Cucujiformia
- Family: Mordellidae
- Genus: Mordellistena
- Species: M. atrogemellata

Binomial name
- Mordellistena atrogemellata Ermisch, 1965

Species of beetle

Mordellistena atrogemellata is a species of beetle in the genus Mordellistena of the family Mordellidae. It was described in 1965 and can be found in Bulgaria, Greece, and North Macedonia.
