= Mordellistena paradohumeralis =

Scientific classification
- Domain: Eukaryota
- Kingdom: Animalia
- Phylum: Arthropoda
- Class: Insecta
- Order: Coleoptera
- Suborder: Polyphaga
- Infraorder: Cucujiformia
- Family: Mordellidae
- Genus: Mordellistena
- Species: M. paradohumeralis

Binomial name
- Mordellistena paradohumeralis Ermisch, 1963

Species of beetle

Mordellistena paradohumeralis is a species of beetle in the genus Mordellistena of the family Mordellidae. It was described by Ermisch in 1963 and is endemic to Cyprus.
