= Mordellistena pseudolatipalposa =

Scientific classification
- Domain: Eukaryota
- Kingdom: Animalia
- Phylum: Arthropoda
- Class: Insecta
- Order: Coleoptera
- Suborder: Polyphaga
- Infraorder: Cucujiformia
- Family: Mordellidae
- Genus: Mordellistena
- Species: M. pseudolatipalposa

Binomial name
- Mordellistena pseudolatipalposa Franciscolo, 1957

Species of beetle

Mordellistena pseudolatipalposa is a species of beetle in the genus Mordellistena of the family Mordellidae. It was described by Franciscolo in 1957.
