= Mordellistena comata =

Scientific classification
- Domain: Eukaryota
- Kingdom: Animalia
- Phylum: Arthropoda
- Class: Insecta
- Order: Coleoptera
- Suborder: Polyphaga
- Infraorder: Cucujiformia
- Family: Mordellidae
- Genus: Mordellistena
- Species: M. comata

Binomial name
- Mordellistena comata (LeConte, 1858)

Synonyms
- Mordella comata LeConte, 1858

Species of beetle

Mordellistena comata is a beetle in the genus Mordellistena of the family Mordellidae. It was described in 1858 by John Lawrence LeConte.
