= Mordellistena fusca =

Scientific classification
- Domain: Eukaryota
- Kingdom: Animalia
- Phylum: Arthropoda
- Class: Insecta
- Order: Coleoptera
- Suborder: Polyphaga
- Infraorder: Cucujiformia
- Family: Mordellidae
- Genus: Mordellistena
- Species: M. fusca

Binomial name
- Mordellistena fusca Lea, 1895

Species of beetle

Mordellistena fusca is a beetle in the genus Mordellistena of the family Mordellidae. It was described in 1895 by Lea. It has been noted for its relatively vibrant coloration compared to other members of the genus.
