= Mordellistena inexpectata =

Scientific classification
- Domain: Eukaryota
- Kingdom: Animalia
- Phylum: Arthropoda
- Class: Insecta
- Order: Coleoptera
- Suborder: Polyphaga
- Infraorder: Cucujiformia
- Family: Mordellidae
- Genus: Mordellistena
- Species: M. inexpectata

Binomial name
- Mordellistena inexpectata Ermisch, 1967

Species of beetle

Mordellistena inexpectata is a species of beetle in the family Mordellidae. It is in the genus Mordellistena. It was described in 1967 by Ermisch, and is found in Germany.
