= Mordellistena episternaloides =

Scientific classification
- Domain: Eukaryota
- Kingdom: Animalia
- Phylum: Arthropoda
- Class: Insecta
- Order: Coleoptera
- Suborder: Polyphaga
- Infraorder: Cucujiformia
- Family: Mordellidae
- Genus: Mordellistena
- Species: M. episternaloides

Binomial name
- Mordellistena episternaloides Ermisch, 1963

Species of beetle

Mordellistena episternaloides is a beetle species in the genus Mordellistena of the family Mordellidae. It was described in 1963 by Ermisch and can be found in France and Germany.
