= Mordellistena eversi =

Scientific classification
- Kingdom: Animalia
- Phylum: Arthropoda
- Clade: Pancrustacea
- Class: Insecta
- Order: Coleoptera
- Suborder: Polyphaga
- Infraorder: Cucujiformia
- Family: Mordellidae
- Genus: Mordellistena
- Species: M. eversi

Binomial name
- Mordellistena eversi Ermisch, 1965

Species of beetle

Mordellistena eversi is a species of beetle in the genus Mordellistena of the family Mordellidae. It was described in 1965 by Ermisch and is endemic to the Canary Islands.
