= Mordellistena exclusa =

Scientific classification
- Domain: Eukaryota
- Kingdom: Animalia
- Phylum: Arthropoda
- Class: Insecta
- Order: Coleoptera
- Suborder: Polyphaga
- Infraorder: Cucujiformia
- Family: Mordellidae
- Genus: Mordellistena
- Species: M. exclusa

Binomial name
- Mordellistena exclusa Ermisch, 1977

Species of beetle

Mordellistena exclusa is a species of beetle in the genus Mordellistena of the family Mordellidae. It was described in 1977 by Ermisch and is endemic to Hungary.
