= Mordellistena baliani =

Scientific classification
- Kingdom: Animalia
- Phylum: Arthropoda
- Clade: Pancrustacea
- Class: Insecta
- Order: Coleoptera
- Suborder: Polyphaga
- Infraorder: Cucujiformia
- Family: Mordellidae
- Genus: Mordellistena
- Species: M. baliani

Binomial name
- Mordellistena baliani Franciscolo, 1942

Species of beetle

Mordellistena baliani is a species of beetle in the genus Mordellistena of the family Mordellidae. It was described in 1942 by Franciscolo and is endemic to Italy.
