= Mordellistena galapagoensis =

Scientific classification
- Domain: Eukaryota
- Kingdom: Animalia
- Phylum: Arthropoda
- Class: Insecta
- Order: Coleoptera
- Suborder: Polyphaga
- Infraorder: Cucujiformia
- Family: Mordellidae
- Genus: Mordellistena
- Species: M. galapagoensis

Binomial name
- Mordellistena galapagoensis Van Dyke, 1953

Species of beetle

Mordellistena galapagoensis is a beetle in the genus Mordellistena of the family Mordellidae. It was described in 1953 by Van Dyke.
