= Mordellistena dolini =

Scientific classification
- Domain: Eukaryota
- Kingdom: Animalia
- Phylum: Arthropoda
- Class: Insecta
- Order: Coleoptera
- Suborder: Polyphaga
- Infraorder: Cucujiformia
- Family: Mordellidae
- Genus: Mordellistena
- Species: M. dolini

Binomial name
- Mordellistena dolini Odnosum, 2005

Species of beetle

Mordellistena dolini is a beetle in the genus Mordellistena of the family Mordellidae. It is found only in Azerbaijan. It was described in 2005 by Odnosum.
