= Mordellistena aegea =

Scientific classification
- Domain: Eukaryota
- Kingdom: Animalia
- Phylum: Arthropoda
- Class: Insecta
- Order: Coleoptera
- Suborder: Polyphaga
- Infraorder: Cucujiformia
- Family: Mordellidae
- Genus: Mordellistena
- Species: M. aegea

Binomial name
- Mordellistena aegea Franciscolo, 1949

Species of beetle

Mordellistena aegea is a species of beetle in the genus Mordellistena of the family Mordellidae that is endemic to Dodecanese islands. It was discovered in 1949.
