= Mordellistena fuscoatra =

Scientific classification
- Domain: Eukaryota
- Kingdom: Animalia
- Phylum: Arthropoda
- Class: Insecta
- Order: Coleoptera
- Suborder: Polyphaga
- Infraorder: Cucujiformia
- Family: Mordellidae
- Genus: Mordellistena
- Species: M. fuscoatra

Binomial name
- Mordellistena fuscoatra Helmuth, 1864

Species of beetle

Mordellistena fuscoatra is a beetle in the genus Mordellistena of the family Mordellidae. It was described in 1864 by Helmuth.
