= Mordellistena balearica =

Scientific classification
- Domain: Eukaryota
- Kingdom: Animalia
- Phylum: Arthropoda
- Class: Insecta
- Order: Coleoptera
- Suborder: Polyphaga
- Infraorder: Cucujiformia
- Family: Mordellidae
- Genus: Mordellistena
- Species: M. balearica

Binomial name
- Mordellistena balearica Compte, 1985

Species of beetle

Mordellistena balearica is a species of beetle in the genus Mordellistena of the family Mordellidae. It was described in 1985 by Compte and is endemic to Balearic Islands.
