= Mordellistena rufilabris =

Scientific classification
- Domain: Eukaryota
- Kingdom: Animalia
- Phylum: Arthropoda
- Class: Insecta
- Order: Coleoptera
- Suborder: Polyphaga
- Infraorder: Cucujiformia
- Family: Mordellidae
- Genus: Mordellistena
- Species: M. rufilabris

Binomial name
- Mordellistena rufilabris Liljeblad, 1945

Species of beetle

Mordellistena rufilabris is a species of beetle in the genus Mordellistena of the family Mordellidae. It was described by Liljeblad in 1945.
