= Mordellistena schoutedeni =

Scientific classification
- Domain: Eukaryota
- Kingdom: Animalia
- Phylum: Arthropoda
- Class: Insecta
- Order: Coleoptera
- Suborder: Polyphaga
- Infraorder: Cucujiformia
- Family: Mordellidae
- Genus: Mordellistena
- Species: M. schoutedeni

Binomial name
- Mordellistena schoutedeni Píc, 1931

Species of beetle

Mordellistena schoutedeni is a species of beetle in the genus Mordellistena, and in the family Mordellidae. It was described by Píc in 1931.
