= Mordellistena anaspoides =

Scientific classification
- Domain: Eukaryota
- Kingdom: Animalia
- Phylum: Arthropoda
- Class: Insecta
- Order: Coleoptera
- Suborder: Polyphaga
- Infraorder: Cucujiformia
- Family: Mordellidae
- Genus: Mordellistena
- Species: M. anaspoides

Binomial name
- Mordellistena anaspoides Franciscolo, 1967

Species of beetle

Mordellistena anaspoides is a species of beetle in the family Mordellidae. It is in the genus Mordellistena. It was discovered in 1967.
