= Mordellistena dentata =

Scientific classification
- Kingdom: Animalia
- Phylum: Arthropoda
- Clade: Pancrustacea
- Class: Insecta
- Order: Coleoptera
- Suborder: Polyphaga
- Infraorder: Cucujiformia
- Family: Mordellidae
- Genus: Mordellistena
- Species: M. dentata

Binomial name
- Mordellistena dentata Batten, 1978

Species of beetle

Mordellistena dentata is a species of beetle in the genus Mordellistena of the family Mordellidae. It was discovered in 1978 by Batten and is native of British Isles.
