= Mordellistena amplicollis =

Scientific classification
- Domain: Eukaryota
- Kingdom: Animalia
- Phylum: Arthropoda
- Class: Insecta
- Order: Coleoptera
- Suborder: Polyphaga
- Infraorder: Cucujiformia
- Family: Mordellidae
- Genus: Mordellistena
- Species: M. amplicollis

Binomial name
- Mordellistena amplicollis Ermisch, 1941

Species of beetle

Mordellistena amplicollis is a species of beetle in the family Mordellidae. It is in the genus Mordellistena. It was discovered in 1941.
