= Mordellistena nubila =

Scientific classification
- Domain: Eukaryota
- Kingdom: Animalia
- Phylum: Arthropoda
- Class: Insecta
- Order: Coleoptera
- Suborder: Polyphaga
- Infraorder: Cucujiformia
- Family: Mordellidae
- Genus: Mordellistena
- Species: M. nubila

Binomial name
- Mordellistena nubila (LeConte, 1858)

Species of beetle

Mordellistena nubila is a species of beetle in the genus Mordellistena of the family Mordellidae. It was described by John Lawrence LeConte in 1858.
