= Mordellistena husseyi =

Scientific classification
- Domain: Eukaryota
- Kingdom: Animalia
- Phylum: Arthropoda
- Class: Insecta
- Order: Coleoptera
- Suborder: Polyphaga
- Infraorder: Cucujiformia
- Family: Mordellidae
- Genus: Mordellistena
- Species: M. husseyi

Binomial name
- Mordellistena husseyi Liljeblad, 1945

Species of beetle

Mordellistena husseyi is a beetle in the genus Mordellistena of the family Mordellidae. It was described in 1945 by Liljeblad.
