= Mordellistena perroudi =

Scientific classification
- Domain: Eukaryota
- Kingdom: Animalia
- Phylum: Arthropoda
- Class: Insecta
- Order: Coleoptera
- Suborder: Polyphaga
- Infraorder: Cucujiformia
- Family: Mordellidae
- Genus: Mordellistena
- Species: M. perroudi

Binomial name
- Mordellistena perroudi Mulsant, 1856

Species of beetle

Mordellistena perroudi is a species of beetle in the genus Mordellistena of the family Mordellidae. It was described by Mulsant in 1856.
