= Mordellistena sexnotata =

Scientific classification
- Domain: Eukaryota
- Kingdom: Animalia
- Phylum: Arthropoda
- Class: Insecta
- Order: Coleoptera
- Suborder: Polyphaga
- Infraorder: Cucujiformia
- Family: Mordellidae
- Genus: Mordellistena
- Species: M. sexnotata

Binomial name
- Mordellistena sexnotata Dury, 1902

Species of beetle

Mordellistena sexnotata is a species of beetle in the genus Mordellistena of the family Mordellidae. It was described by Dury in 1902.
