= Mordellistena stephani =

Scientific classification
- Domain: Eukaryota
- Kingdom: Animalia
- Phylum: Arthropoda
- Class: Insecta
- Order: Coleoptera
- Suborder: Polyphaga
- Infraorder: Cucujiformia
- Family: Mordellidae
- Genus: Mordellistena
- Species: M. stephani

Binomial name
- Mordellistena stephani Downie, 1987

Species of beetle

Mordellistena stephani is a species of beetle in the genus Mordellistena of the family Mordellidae. It was first described by Norville Morgan Downie in 1987.
