= Mordellistena coelioxys =

Scientific classification
- Domain: Eukaryota
- Kingdom: Animalia
- Phylum: Arthropoda
- Class: Insecta
- Order: Coleoptera
- Suborder: Polyphaga
- Infraorder: Cucujiformia
- Family: Mordellidae
- Genus: Mordellistena
- Species: M. coelioxys

Binomial name
- Mordellistena coelioxys Lea, 1917

Species of beetle

Mordellistena coelioxys is a beetle in the genus Mordellistena of the family Mordellidae. It was described in 1917 by Lea.
