= Mordellistena intermixta =

Scientific classification
- Domain: Eukaryota
- Kingdom: Animalia
- Phylum: Arthropoda
- Class: Insecta
- Order: Coleoptera
- Suborder: Polyphaga
- Infraorder: Cucujiformia
- Family: Mordellidae
- Genus: Mordellistena
- Species: M. intermixta

Binomial name
- Mordellistena intermixta Costa, 1854

Species of beetle

Mordellistena intermixta is a species of beetle in the family Mordellidae. It is in the genus Mordellistena. It was discovered in 1865.
