= Mordellistena delicatula =

Scientific classification
- Domain: Eukaryota
- Kingdom: Animalia
- Phylum: Arthropoda
- Class: Insecta
- Order: Coleoptera
- Suborder: Polyphaga
- Infraorder: Cucujiformia
- Family: Mordellidae
- Genus: Mordellistena
- Species: M. delicatula

Binomial name
- Mordellistena delicatula Dury, 1906

Species of beetle

Mordellistena delicatula is a beetle in the genus Mordellistena of the family Mordellidae. It was described in 1906 by Dury.
