= Mordellistena exclamationis =

Scientific classification
- Kingdom: Animalia
- Phylum: Arthropoda
- Class: Insecta
- Order: Coleoptera
- Suborder: Polyphaga
- Infraorder: Cucujiformia
- Family: Mordellidae
- Genus: Mordellistena
- Species: M. exclamationis

Binomial name
- Mordellistena exclamationis Pic, 1924

Species of beetle

Mordellistena exclamationis is a beetle in the genus Mordellistena of the family Mordellidae. It was described in 1924 by Maurice Pic.
