= Mordellistena klapperichi =

Scientific classification
- Kingdom: Animalia
- Phylum: Arthropoda
- Class: Insecta
- Order: Coleoptera
- Suborder: Polyphaga
- Infraorder: Cucujiformia
- Family: Mordellidae
- Genus: Mordellistena
- Species: M. klapperichi

Binomial name
- Mordellistena klapperichi Ermisch, 1956

Species of beetle

Mordellistena klapperichi is a beetle in the genus Mordellistena of the family Mordellidae. It was described in 1956 by Ermisch.
