= Mordellistena errans =

Scientific classification
- Domain: Eukaryota
- Kingdom: Animalia
- Phylum: Arthropoda
- Class: Insecta
- Order: Coleoptera
- Suborder: Polyphaga
- Infraorder: Cucujiformia
- Family: Mordellidae
- Genus: Mordellistena
- Species: M. errans

Binomial name
- Mordellistena errans Fall, 1907

Species of beetle

Mordellistena errans is a beetle in the genus Mordellistena of the family Mordellidae. It was described in 1907 by Fall.
