= Mordellistena smithi =

Scientific classification
- Domain: Eukaryota
- Kingdom: Animalia
- Phylum: Arthropoda
- Class: Insecta
- Order: Coleoptera
- Suborder: Polyphaga
- Infraorder: Cucujiformia
- Family: Mordellidae
- Genus: Mordellistena
- Species: M. smith

Binomial name
- Mordellistena smith Dury, 1902

Species of beetle

Mordellistena smithi is a species of beetle in the family Mordellidae. It was described by Dury in 1902.
