= Mordellistena maroccana =

Scientific classification
- Domain: Eukaryota
- Kingdom: Animalia
- Phylum: Arthropoda
- Class: Insecta
- Order: Coleoptera
- Suborder: Polyphaga
- Infraorder: Cucujiformia
- Family: Mordellidae
- Genus: Mordellistena
- Species: M. maroccana

Binomial name
- Mordellistena maroccana Costa, 1854

Species of beetle

Mordellistena maroccana is a species of beetle is the family Mordellidae.
