= Mordella erythrura =

Scientific classification
- Kingdom: Animalia
- Phylum: Arthropoda
- Class: Insecta
- Order: Coleoptera
- Suborder: Polyphaga
- Infraorder: Cucujiformia
- Family: Mordellidae
- Genus: Mordella
- Species: M. erythrura

Binomial name
- Mordella erythrura Fairmaire & Germain, 1863

Species of beetle

Mordella erythrura is a species of beetle in the Mordella of the family Mordellidae, which is part of the superfamily Tenebrionoidea. It was discovered in 1863.
