= Hyperaspis funesta =

Scientific classification
- Kingdom: Animalia
- Phylum: Arthropoda
- Clade: Pancrustacea
- Class: Insecta
- Order: Coleoptera
- Suborder: Polyphaga
- Infraorder: Cucujiformia
- Family: Coccinellidae
- Genus: Hyperaspis
- Species: H. funesta

Binomial name
- Hyperaspis funesta (Germain, 1854)

Synonyms
- Coccinella funesta Germain, 1854; Hyperaspis chilensis Crotch, 1874

Species of beetle

Hyperaspis funesta is a species of beetle of the family Coccinellidae. It is found in Argentina and Chile.

== Description ==
Adults reach a length of about 1.9–2.4 mm. They have a black body and yellow head. The pronotum is black with the anterior and lateral borders yellow. The elytron has one yellow spot.
