= Mordella summermanae =

Scientific classification
- Domain: Eukaryota
- Kingdom: Animalia
- Phylum: Arthropoda
- Class: Insecta
- Order: Coleoptera
- Suborder: Polyphaga
- Infraorder: Cucujiformia
- Family: Mordellidae
- Subfamily: Mordellinae
- Tribe: Mordellini
- Genus: Mordella
- Species: M. summermanae

Binomial name
- Mordella summermanae Ray, 1939

Species of beetles

Mordella summermanae is a species of tumbling flower beetle in the family Mordellidae. It is found on the Caribbean islands.
