= Mordella inusitata =

Scientific classification
- Domain: Eukaryota
- Kingdom: Animalia
- Phylum: Arthropoda
- Class: Insecta
- Order: Coleoptera
- Suborder: Polyphaga
- Infraorder: Cucujiformia
- Family: Mordellidae
- Genus: Mordella
- Species: M. inusitata

Binomial name
- Mordella inusitata Blackburn, 1893

Species of beetle

Mordella inusitata is a species of beetle in the genus Mordella of the family Mordellidae, which is part of the superfamily Tenebrionoidea. It was discovered in 1893. The larvae bore into dead wood, and in Australia have been recorded on the introduced conifers of pine and Douglas fir.
