= Mordella mastersi =

Scientific classification
- Domain: Eukaryota
- Kingdom: Animalia
- Phylum: Arthropoda
- Class: Insecta
- Order: Coleoptera
- Suborder: Polyphaga
- Infraorder: Cucujiformia
- Family: Mordellidae
- Genus: Mordella
- Species: M. mastersi

Binomial name
- Mordella mastersi Lea, 1895

Species of beetle

Mordella mastersi is a species of beetle in the genus Mordella of the family Mordellidae, which is part of the superfamily Tenebrionoidea. It was discovered in 1895.
