= Mordella leucaspis =

Scientific classification
- Domain: Eukaryota
- Kingdom: Animalia
- Phylum: Arthropoda
- Class: Insecta
- Order: Coleoptera
- Suborder: Polyphaga
- Infraorder: Cucujiformia
- Family: Mordellidae
- Subfamily: Mordellinae
- Tribe: Mordellini
- Genus: Mordella
- Species: M. leucaspis

Binomial name
- Mordella leucaspis Küster, 1849

Synonyms
- Mordella adnexa Ermisch, 1969; Mordella persica Apfelbeck, 1914

Species of beetles

Mordella leucaspis is a species of tumbling flower beetle in the family Mordellidae. It is found in Europe.

== Subspecies ==
These two subspecies belong to the species Mordella leucaspis:

- Mordella leucaspis bicoloripilosa Horak, 1985
- Mordella leucaspis leucaspis Kuster, 1849
