= Mordella alboscutellata =

Scientific classification
- Domain: Eukaryota
- Kingdom: Animalia
- Phylum: Arthropoda
- Class: Insecta
- Order: Coleoptera
- Suborder: Polyphaga
- Infraorder: Cucujiformia
- Family: Mordellidae
- Genus: Mordella
- Species: M. alboscutellata

Binomial name
- Mordella alboscutellata Lea, 1895

Species of beetle

Mordella alboscutellata is a species of beetle in the genus Mordella of the family Mordellidae. It was described in 1895.
