= Mordella hubbsi =

Scientific classification
- Domain: Eukaryota
- Kingdom: Animalia
- Phylum: Arthropoda
- Class: Insecta
- Order: Coleoptera
- Suborder: Polyphaga
- Infraorder: Cucujiformia
- Family: Mordellidae
- Genus: Mordella
- Species: M. hubbsi

Binomial name
- Mordella hubbsi Liljeblad, 1922

Species of beetle

Mordella hubbsi is a species of beetle in the genus Mordella of the family Mordellidae, which is part of the superfamily Tenebrionoidea. It was discovered in 1922. Mordella hubbsi is found in the western United States.

Adults are mostly black and gray with rusty brown coloring on the femora of their front and middle sets of legs, which distinguishes them from similar species of Mordella. Individuals reach 5–6 millimetres (0.20–0.24 in) in length and are active June and July.
