= Mordella australis =

Scientific classification
- Domain: Eukaryota
- Kingdom: Animalia
- Phylum: Arthropoda
- Class: Insecta
- Order: Coleoptera
- Suborder: Polyphaga
- Infraorder: Cucujiformia
- Family: Mordellidae
- Genus: Mordella
- Species: M. australis

Binomial name
- Mordella australis Boisduval, 1835

Species of beetle

Mordella australis is a species of beetle in the genus Mordella of the family Mordellidae. It was described in 1835.
