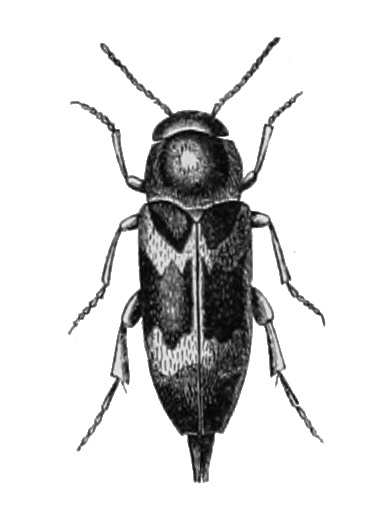

Scientific classification
- Domain: Eukaryota
- Kingdom: Animalia
- Phylum: Arthropoda
- Class: Insecta
- Order: Coleoptera
- Suborder: Polyphaga
- Infraorder: Cucujiformia
- Family: Mordellidae
- Genus: Mordella
- Species: M. ornata

Binomial name
- Mordella ornata Waterhouse, 1878

= Mordella ornata =

Species of beetle

Mordella ornata is a species of beetle in the family Mordellidae, which belongs to the superfamily Tenebrionoidea. It was discovered in 1878.
