= Mordella argentifera =

Scientific classification
- Domain: Eukaryota
- Kingdom: Animalia
- Phylum: Arthropoda
- Class: Insecta
- Order: Coleoptera
- Suborder: Polyphaga
- Infraorder: Cucujiformia
- Family: Mordellidae
- Genus: Mordella
- Species: M. argentifera

Binomial name
- Mordella argentifera Fairmaire, 1849

Species of beetle

Mordella argentifera is a species of beetle in the genus Mordella of the family Mordellidae. It was described in 1849.
