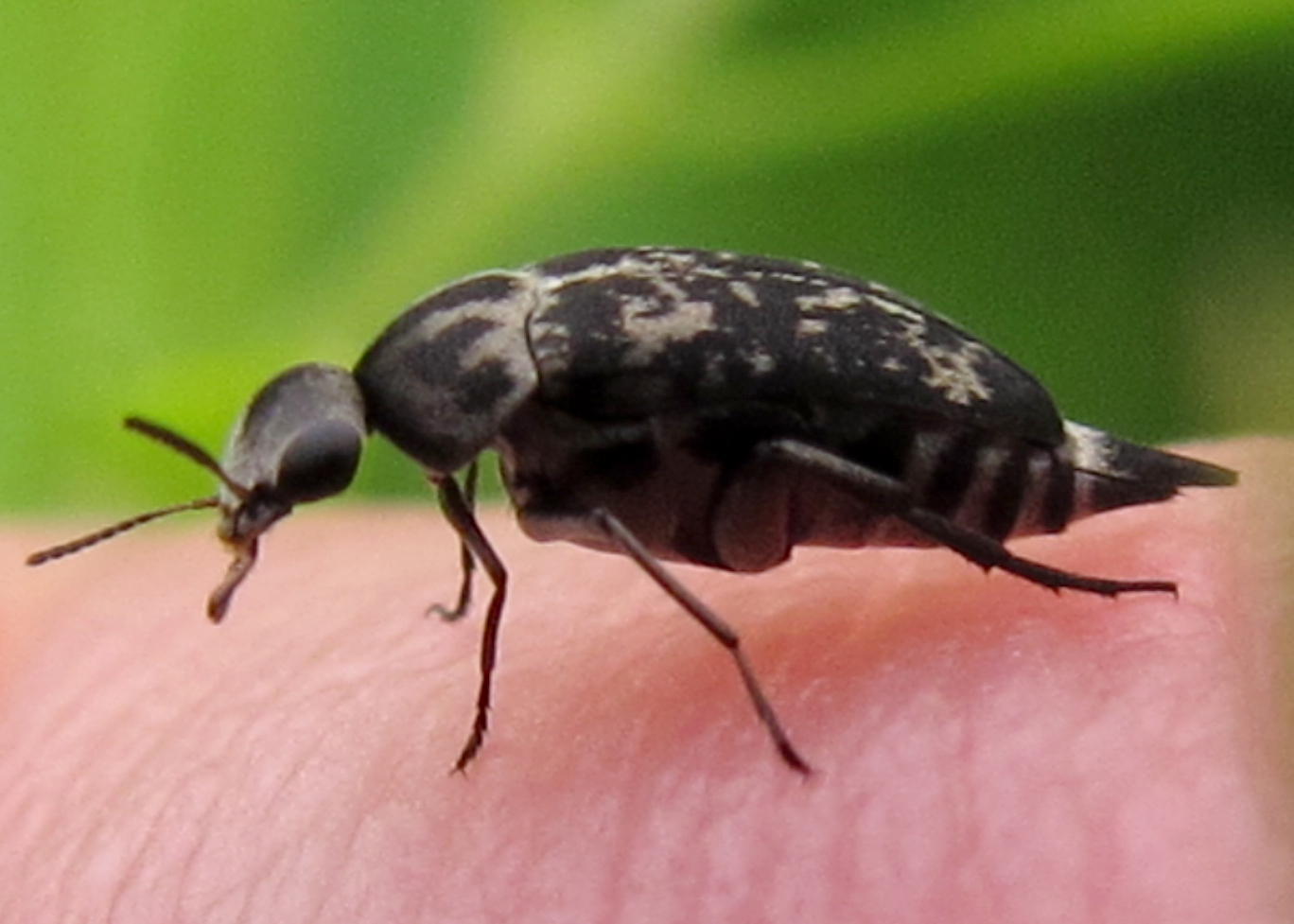

Conservation status
- Secure (NatureServe)

Scientific classification
- Domain: Eukaryota
- Kingdom: Animalia
- Phylum: Arthropoda
- Class: Insecta
- Order: Coleoptera
- Suborder: Polyphaga
- Infraorder: Cucujiformia
- Family: Mordellidae
- Genus: Mordella
- Species: M. marginata

Binomial name
- Mordella marginata Melsheimer, 1845

= Mordella marginata =

Species of beetle

Mordella marginata, the tumbling ragdoll flower beetle, is a species of Mordellidae that occurs in North America.
