= Mordella promiscua =

Scientific classification
- Kingdom: Animalia
- Phylum: Arthropoda
- Class: Insecta
- Order: Coleoptera
- Suborder: Polyphaga
- Infraorder: Cucujiformia
- Family: Mordellidae
- Subfamily: Mordellinae
- Tribe: Mordellini
- Genus: Mordella
- Species: M. promiscua

Binomial name
- Mordella promiscua Ermisch, 1942

Synonyms
- Mordella bella Waterhouse 1878; Mordella detracta Pascoe 1876, Mordella elegantula Waterhouse 1878; Mordella felix Waterhouse 1878; Mordella limbata Waterhouse 1878

Species of beetle

Mordella promiscua is a species of beetle in the genus Mordella of the family Mordellidae, which is part of the superfamily Tenebrionoidea. It was discovered in 1942.
