= Mordella jucunda =

Scientific classification
- Kingdom: Animalia
- Phylum: Arthropoda
- Class: Insecta
- Order: Coleoptera
- Suborder: Polyphaga
- Infraorder: Cucujiformia
- Family: Mordellidae
- Subfamily: Mordellinae
- Tribe: Mordellini
- Genus: Mordella
- Species: M. jucunda

Binomial name
- Mordella jucunda (Broun 1880)

Synonyms
- Mordellistena jucunda Broun 1880

Species of beetles

Mordella jucunda is a species of tumbling flower beetle in the family Mordellidae, found in New Zealand.
