= Mordella leai =

Scientific classification
- Kingdom: Animalia
- Phylum: Arthropoda
- Class: Insecta
- Order: Coleoptera
- Suborder: Polyphaga
- Infraorder: Cucujiformia
- Family: Mordellidae
- Genus: Mordella
- Species: M. leai

Binomial name
- Mordella leai Csiki, 1915

Species of beetle

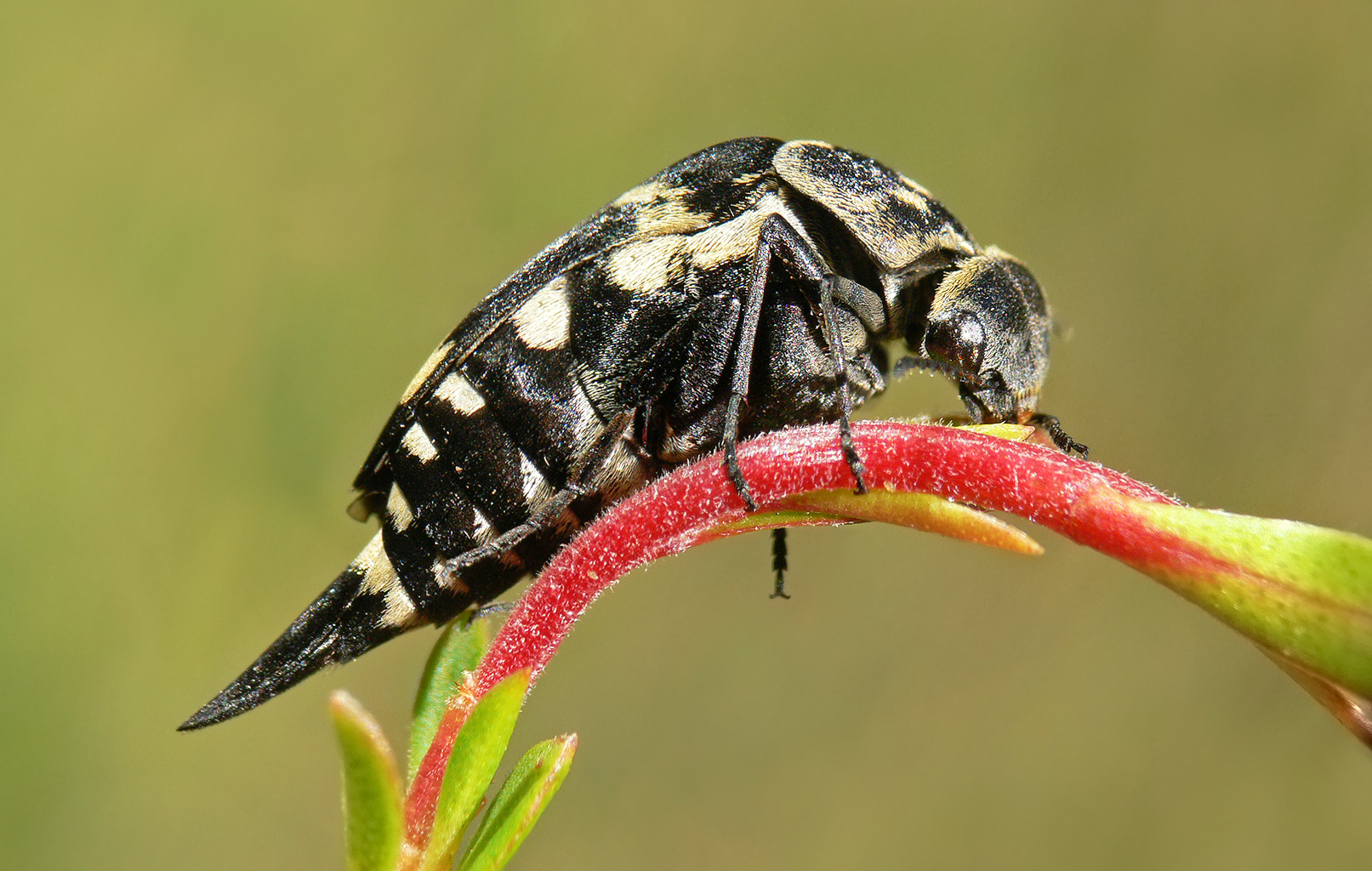

Mordella leai is a species of beetle in the genus Mordella of the family Mordellidae, which is part of the superfamily Tenebrionoidea. It was discovered in 1915.

A common group of small, hairy beetles with curved bodies that end in a sharp point. They are often found on flowers.
