= Mordella africana =

Scientific classification
- Domain: Eukaryota
- Kingdom: Animalia
- Phylum: Arthropoda
- Class: Insecta
- Order: Coleoptera
- Suborder: Polyphaga
- Infraorder: Cucujiformia
- Family: Mordellidae
- Genus: Mordella
- Species: M. africana

Binomial name
- Mordella africana Franciscolo, 1955

Species of beetle

Mordella africana is a species of beetle in the genus Mordella of the family Mordellidae. It was described in 1955.
