= Mordella yami =

Scientific classification
- Domain: Eukaryota
- Kingdom: Animalia
- Phylum: Arthropoda
- Class: Insecta
- Order: Coleoptera
- Suborder: Polyphaga
- Infraorder: Cucujiformia
- Family: Mordellidae
- Genus: Mordella
- Species: M. yami

Binomial name
- Mordella yami Nomura, 1967

Species of beetle

Mordella yami is a species of beetle in the Mordella type genus of the family Mordellidae, which is part of the superfamily Tenebrionoidea. It was described in 1967.
