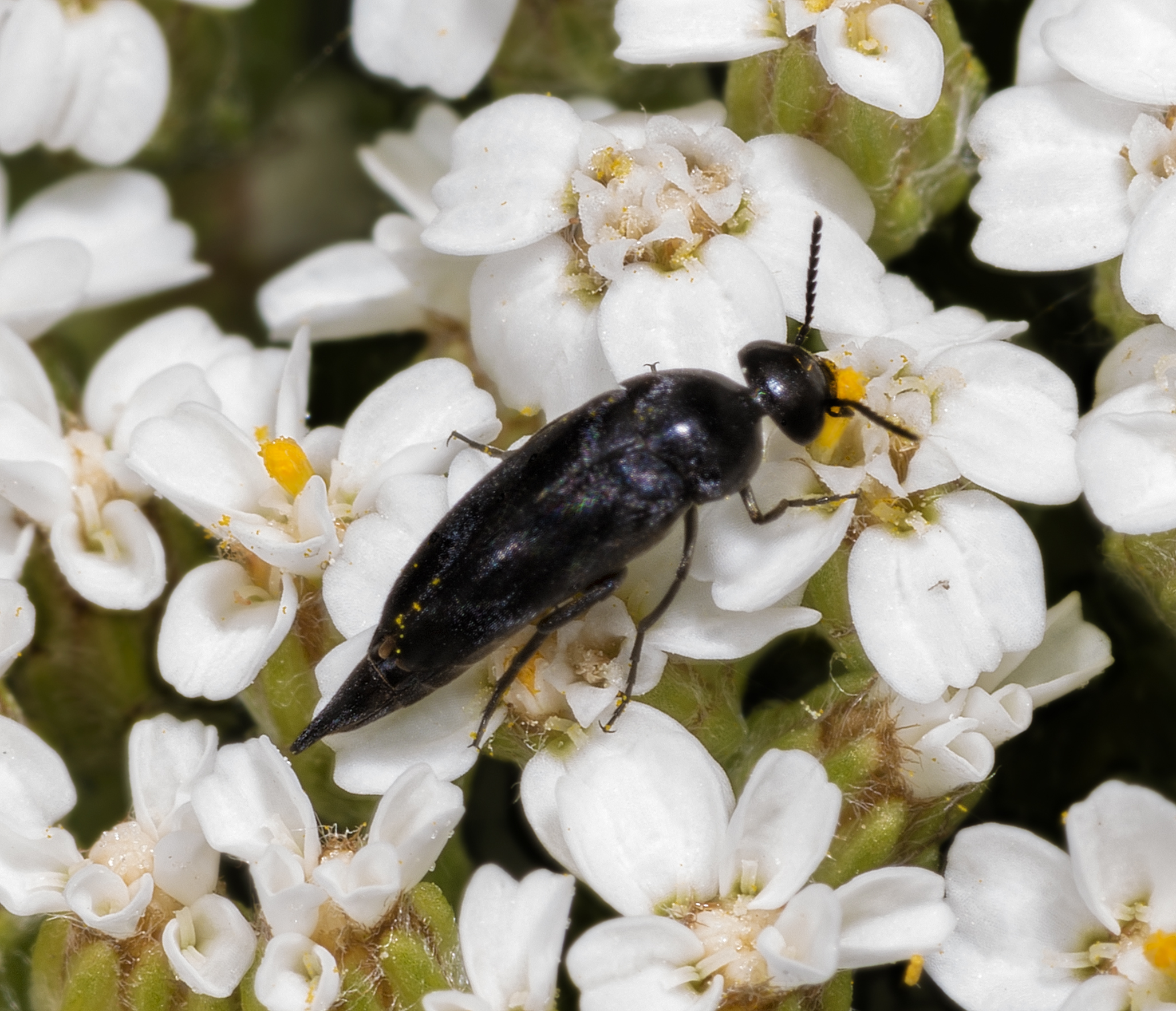
- Imago of Mordella aculeata

Scientific classification
- Kingdom: Animalia
- Phylum: Arthropoda
- Clade: Pancrustacea
- Class: Insecta
- Order: Coleoptera
- Suborder: Polyphaga
- Infraorder: Cucujiformia
- Family: Mordellidae
- Subfamily: Mordellinae
- Tribe: Mordellini
- Genus: Mordella
- Species: M. aculeata

Binomial name
- Mordella aculeata Linnaeus, 1758

Synonyms
- Mordella communis Matsumura, 1915; Mordella meridionalis Méquignon, 1946

= Mordella aculeata =

Species of beetles

Mordella aculeata is a species of tumbling flower beetle in the family Mordellidae, found in Europe.

== Subspecies ==
- Mordella aculeata aculeata Linnaeus, 1758
- Mordella aculeata multilineata Champion, 1927
- Mordella aculeata nigripalpis Shchegolvera-Barovskaya, 1931
