= Mordella albosuturalis =

Scientific classification
- Domain: Eukaryota
- Kingdom: Animalia
- Phylum: Arthropoda
- Class: Insecta
- Order: Coleoptera
- Suborder: Polyphaga
- Infraorder: Cucujiformia
- Family: Mordellidae
- Genus: Mordella
- Species: M. albosuturalis

Binomial name
- Mordella albosuturalis Liljeblad, 1922

Species of beetle

Mordella albosuturalis is a species of beetle in the genus Mordella of the family Mordellidae. It was described in 1922.
