= Mordella deserta =

Scientific classification
- Domain: Eukaryota
- Kingdom: Animalia
- Phylum: Arthropoda
- Class: Insecta
- Order: Coleoptera
- Suborder: Polyphaga
- Infraorder: Cucujiformia
- Family: Mordellidae
- Genus: Mordella
- Species: M. deserta

Binomial name
- Mordella deserta Casey, 1885

Species of beetle

Mordella deserta is a species of beetle in the genus Mordella of the family Mordellidae. Discovered in 1885, it is a part of the superfamily Tenebrionoidea.
