= Mordella mariaclairae =

Scientific classification
- Kingdom: Animalia
- Phylum: Arthropoda
- Clade: Pancrustacea
- Class: Insecta
- Order: Coleoptera
- Suborder: Polyphaga
- Infraorder: Cucujiformia
- Family: Mordellidae
- Genus: Mordella
- Species: M. mariaclairae

Binomial name
- Mordella mariaclairae Leblanc, 2013

Species of beetle

Mordella mariaclairae is a species of tumbling flower beetle found in Northern Brazil and French Guiana.
