= Mordella mongolica =

Scientific classification
- Domain: Eukaryota
- Kingdom: Animalia
- Phylum: Arthropoda
- Class: Insecta
- Order: Coleoptera
- Suborder: Polyphaga
- Infraorder: Cucujiformia
- Family: Mordellidae
- Subfamily: Mordellinae
- Tribe: Mordellini
- Genus: Mordella
- Species: M. mongolica

Binomial name
- Mordella mongolica Ermisch, 1964

Species of beetle

Mordella mongolica is a species of tumbling flower beetles of the family Mordellidae. It was discovered in 1964.
