= Mordella quadrimaculata =

Scientific classification
- Domain: Eukaryota
- Kingdom: Animalia
- Phylum: Arthropoda
- Class: Insecta
- Order: Coleoptera
- Suborder: Polyphaga
- Infraorder: Cucujiformia
- Family: Mordellidae
- Genus: Mordella
- Species: M. quadrimaculata

Binomial name
- Mordella quadrimaculata Lea, 1917

Synonyms
- Mordella quadrimaculata Pic, 1928

Species of beetle

Mordella quadrimaculata is a species of beetle in the genus Mordella of the family Mordellidae, which is part of the superfamily Tenebrionoidea. It was discovered in 1917.
