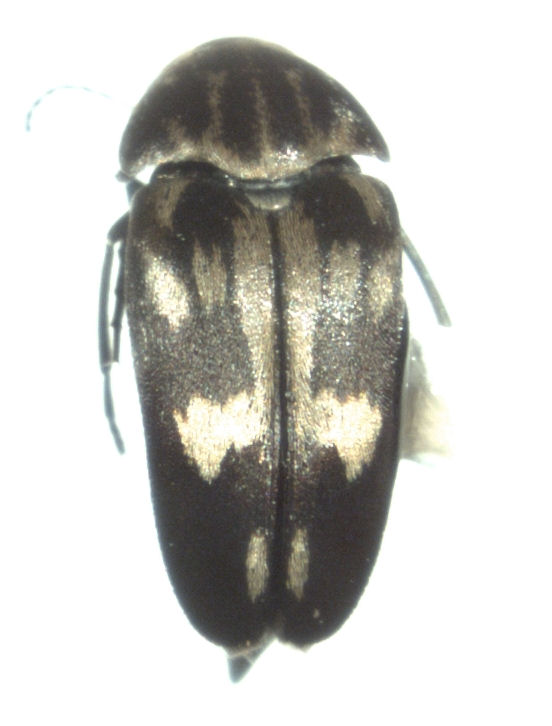

Scientific classification
- Kingdom: Animalia
- Phylum: Arthropoda
- Class: Insecta
- Order: Coleoptera
- Suborder: Polyphaga
- Infraorder: Cucujiformia
- Family: Mordellidae
- Subfamily: Mordellinae
- Tribe: Mordellini
- Genus: Zeamordella
- Species: Z. monacha

Binomial name
- Zeamordella monacha Broun, 1886

Synonyms
- Mordella graphiptera Champion, 1895; Trichotomoxia demarzi Ermisch 1962

= Zeamordella monacha =

Species of beetle

Zeamordella is a genus of tumbling flower beetles in the family Mordellidae. This genus has a single species, Zeamordella monacha.
