= Mediimorda bipunctata =

Scientific classification
- Kingdom: Animalia
- Phylum: Arthropoda
- Class: Insecta
- Order: Coleoptera
- Suborder: Polyphaga
- Infraorder: Cucujiformia
- Family: Mordellidae
- Subfamily: Mordellinae
- Tribe: Mordellini
- Genus: Mediimorda
- Species: M. bipunctata

Binomial name
- Mediimorda bipunctata (Germar, 1827)

Synonyms
- Mordella abbreviata Schilsky, 1899; Mordella bipunctata Germar, 1823; Mordella castellanii Franciscolo, 1949; Mordella decora Chevrolat, 1840; Mordella perpicilata Costa, 1854

Species of beetles

Mediimorda bipunctata is a species of tumbling flower beetle in the family Mordellidae, found in southern Europe.
