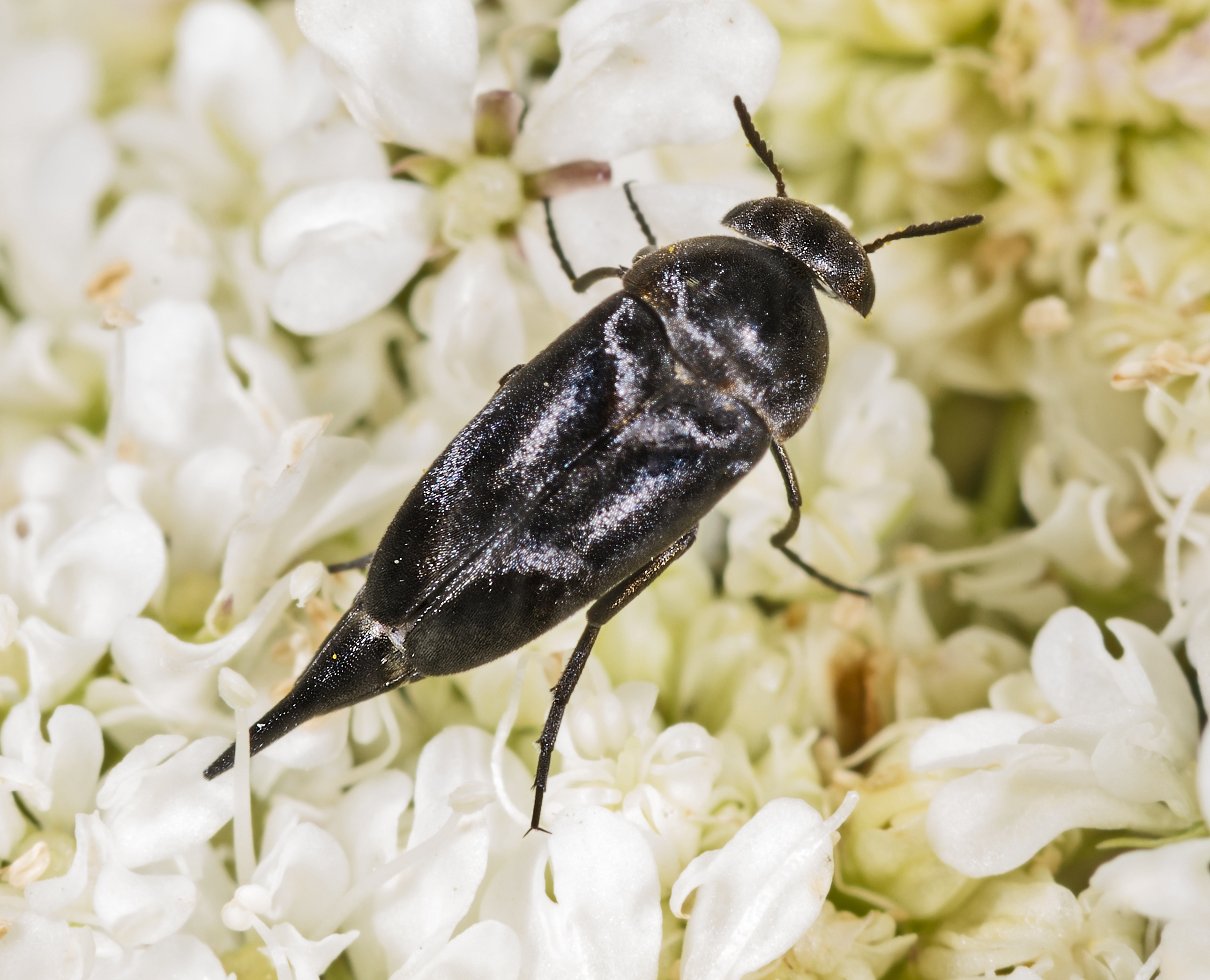
- Image of Mordella aculeata

Scientific classification
- Kingdom: Animalia
- Phylum: Arthropoda
- Clade: Pancrustacea
- Class: Insecta
- Order: Coleoptera
- Suborder: Polyphaga
- Infraorder: Cucujiformia
- Family: Mordellidae
- Subfamily: Mordellinae
- Tribe: Mordellini
- Genus: Mordella; Linnaeus, 1758

Type species
- Mordella aculeata Linnaeus, 1758

Synonyms
- Mordellistena Broun, 1880 (non Costa, 1854: preoccupied)

= Mordella =

Genus of beetles

Mordella is the type genus of the tumbling flower beetle family (Mordellidae), its subfamily Mordellinae and the tribe Mordellini. Its species are found on every continent except Antarctica. The larvae are primarily dead wood borers.

== Species ==
Species of Mordella include:

- Mordella abbreviata Solier, 1851
- Mordella aculeata Linnaeus, 1758
- Mordella adipata Lea, 1917
- Mordella aeruginosa Champion, 1891
- Mordella africana Franciscolo, 1955
- Mordella albiventris Maeklin, 1875
- Mordella albodispersa Pic, 1933
- Mordella albomacaculata Lucas, 1857
- Mordella albonotata Maeklin, 1875
- Mordella alboscutellata Lea, 1895
- Mordella albosparsa Gemminger, 1870
- Mordella albosuturalis Liljeblad, 1922
- Mordella alphabetica Lea, 1917
- Mordella amoena Maeklin, 1875
- Mordella andina Fairmaire & Germain, 1863
- Mordella angulata LeConte, 1878
- Mordella apicalis Pic, 1929
- Mordella aradasiana Patti, 1840
- Mordella argenteonotata Pic, 1936
- Mordella argentifera Fairmaire, 1849
- Mordella argentipunctata Curtis, 1845
- Mordella atrata Melsheimer, 1845
- Mordella atripes Pic, 1936
- Mordella aureofasciata Pic, 1917
- Mordella aurolineata Ray, 1936
- Mordella auronotata Lea, 1917
- Mordella auropubescens Ray, 1936
- Mordella auroviolacea Ray, 1936
- Mordella australis Boisduval, 1835
- Mordella baldiensis Blackburn, 1891
- Mordella bicoloriceps Pic, 1936
- Mordella bicoloriventris Pic, 1936
- Mordella biformis Champion, 1891
- Mordella biquadrinotata Pic, 1936
- Mordella bistrimaculata Pic, 1936
- Mordella blanchardi Solier, 1851
- Mordella blanda Lea, 1917
- Mordella brachyura Mulsant, 1856
- Mordella brasiliana Maeklin, 1875
- Mordella brevis Lea, 1902
- Mordella brevistylis Liljeblad, 1922
- Mordella bribiensis Lea, 1921
- Mordella brincki Franciscolo, 1965
- Mordella calodema Lea, 1917
- Mordella calopasa Lea, 1917
- Mordella caloptera Lea, 1917
- Mordella capillosa Liljeblad, 1945
- Mordella cara Blackburn, 1893
- Mordella caracaensis Pic, 1929
- Mordella caroli Lea, 1896
- Mordella castaneipennis Fairmaire & Germain, 1863
- Mordella chevrolati Champion, 1891
- Mordella cinereoatra Liljeblad, 1945
- Mordella clavicornis Kirby, 1818
- Mordella communis Waterhouse, 1878
- Mordella comptei Plaza, 1977
- Mordella consobrina Maeklin, 1875
- Mordella conspecta Lea, 1917
- Mordella corvina Lea, 1917
- Mordella cuneata Lea, 1902
- Mordella curtipennis Pic, 1936
- Mordella decorata Maeklin, 1875
- Mordella deserta Casey, 1885
- Mordella distincta Lea, 1895
- Mordella dodonaeae Montrouzier, 1860
- Mordella dumbrelli Lea, 1895
- Mordella duodecimpunctata Rossi, 1790
- Mordella duplicata Schilsky, 1895
- Mordella elegantula Csiki, 1915
- Mordella erythrura Fairmaire & Germain, 1863
- Mordella festiva Lea, 1895
- Mordella flavicans W.J. Macleay, 1887
- Mordella flavopunctata Castelnau, 1833
- Mordella flexuosa Fairmaire & Germain, 1863
- Mordella fruhstorferi Pic, 1936
- Mordella fuliginosa Maeklin, 1875
- Mordella fulvonotata Maeklin, 1875
- Mordella fulvosignata Fairmaire & Germain, 1863
- Mordella fumosa Fairmaire & Germain, 1863
- Mordella fuscipilis Champion, 1895
- Mordella fuscocinerea Fall, 1907
- Mordella gounellei Pic, 1924
- Mordella goyasensis Pic, 1929
- Mordella grandis Liljeblad, 1922
- Mordella graphiptera Champion, 1895
- Mordella gratiosa Plaza & Compte, 1980
- Mordella griseosuturalis Pic, 1936
- Mordella guyanensis Pic, 1929
- Mordella haemorrhoidalis Fabricius, 1801
- Mordella hamata Fabricius, 1801
- Mordella hamatilis W.J. Macleay, 1887
- Mordella heros Palm, 1823
- Mordella hieroglyphica Fairmaire & Germain, 1863
- Mordella hoberlandti Horak, 1985
- Mordella hofferi Horak, 1979
- Mordella holomelaena Apfelbeck, 1914
- Mordella holosericea Solier, 1851
- Mordella hoshihanamima Franciscolo, 1965
- Mordella hubbsi Liljeblad, 1922
- Mordella huetheri Ermisch, 1956
- Mordella humeralis Waterhouse, 1878
- Mordella humeropicta Ermisch, 1962
- Mordella ignota Lea, 1895
- Mordella immaculata Smith, 1883
- Mordella inconspicua Lea, 1895
- Mordella indata Statz, 1952
- Mordella inornata Lea, 1902
- Mordella inouei Nomura, 1958
- Mordella insulata LeConte, 1859
- Mordella inusitata Blackburn, 1893
- Mordella invisitata Liljeblad, 1945
- Mordella iridea Lea, 1917
- Mordella jucunda Broun, 1880
- Mordella knulli Liljeblad, 1922
- Mordella krausei Philippi & Philippi, 1864
- Mordella lapidicola Wickham, 1909
- Mordella latejuncta Pic, 1924
- Mordella latemaculata Ray, 1944
- Mordella laterufescens Pic, 1936
- Mordella leai Csiki, 1915
- Mordella legionensis Plaza & Compte, 1980
- Mordella lemoulti Pic, 1936
- Mordella leucaspis Küster, 1849
- Mordella leucostigma Fairmaire & Germain, 1863
- Mordella lineatonotata Ray, 1936
- Mordella longegumeralis Pic, 1936
- Mordella longehumeralis Pic, 1936
- Mordella longicauda Roubal, 1921
- Mordella luctuosa Solier, 1851
- Mordella lunulata Helmuth, 1865
- Mordella luteodispersa Pic, 1936
- Mordella luteosuturalis Pic, 1936
- Mordella maculipennis Ray, 1936
- Mordella major Pic, 1936
- Mordella malleri Pic, 1936
- Mordella marginata Melsheimer, 1845
- Mordella mariaclairae Leblanc, 2013
- Mordella marmorata Fabricius, 1801
- Mordella maroniensis Pic, 1924
- Mordella mastersi Lea, 1895
- Mordella mediolineata Pic, 1936
- Mordella melaena Germar, 1824
- Mordella meridionalis Méquignon, 1946
- Mordella mesoleuca Lea, 1929
- Mordella metasternalis Lea, 1917
- Mordella mexicana Champion, 1891
- Mordella minima Montrouzier, 1860
- Mordella mixta Fabricius, 1801
- Mordella mongolica Ermisch, 1964
- Mordella moorei (Perroud, 1864)
- Mordella nana Fairmaire & Germain, 1863
- Mordella nigrans W.J. Macleay, 1887
- Mordella nigroapicalis Pic, 1941
- Mordella nigromaculata Champion, 1891
- Mordella niveoscutellata Nakane & Nomura, 1950
- Mordella norfolcensis Lea, 1917
- Mordella notatipennis Lea, 1917
- Mordella novemmaculata Lea, 1902
- Mordella novemnotata Ray, 1944
- Mordella obliqua LeConte, 1878
- Mordella obliquirufa Lea, 1917
- Mordella obscuripennis W.J. Macleay, 1887
- Mordella ochrotricha Nomura, 1958
- Mordella ornata Waterhouse, 1878
- Mordella ovalisticta W.J. Macleay, 1887
- Mordella pallida Lea, 1895
- Mordella palmae Emery, 1876
- Mordella parva Champion, 1895
- Mordella pauli Pic, 1924
- Mordella pauper Maeklin, 1875
- Mordella perspicillata Costa, 1854
- Mordella picta Chevrolat, 1829
- Mordella plaumanni Pic, 1936
- Mordella poeciloptera Lea, 1929
- Mordella pondolandiae Franciscolo, 1965
- Mordella pretiosa Champion, 1891
- Mordella priscula Cockerell, 1925
- Mordella promiscua Erichson, 1842
- Mordella proxima Solier, 1851
- Mordella pulchra Lea, 1895
- Mordella pulverulenta W.J. Macleay, 1887
- Mordella punctulata Maeklin, 1875
- Mordella purpurascens Apfelbeck, 1914
- Mordella pustulosa Champion, 1891
- Mordella pygidialis Apfelbeck, 1914
- Mordella pygmaea Champion, 1895
- Mordella quadrimaculata Lea, 1917
- Mordella quadripunctata (Say, 1824)
- Mordella quadripustulata Maeklin, 1875
- Mordella quadrisignata Chevrolat, 1834
- Mordella quomoi Franciscolo, 1942
- Mordella reitteri Pic, 1936
- Mordella robusta Pic, 1936
- Mordella rudebecki Franciscolo, 1965
- Mordella ruficauda Maeklin, 1875
- Mordella ruficollis Waterhouse, 1878
- Mordella rufipennis Solier, 1851
- Mordella rufipes Lea, 1895
- Mordella rufomaculata Champion, 1891
- Mordella rufopectoralis Pic, 1936
- Mordella rufoaxillaris Fairmaire & Germain, 1860
- Mordella scheelei Ermisch, 1941
- Mordella schwarzi Liljeblad, 1945
- Mordella scita Maeklin, 1875
- Mordella sellata Champion, 1891
- Mordella seriata Champion, 1891
- Mordella sericans Lea, 1917
- Mordella sexdecimguttata Montrouzier, 1860
- Mordella sexnotata Champion, 1891
- Mordella shirozui Nomura, 1967
- Mordella signata Champion, 1891
- Mordella simillima Lea, 1902
- Mordella sticticoptera Champion, 1891
- Mordella stygia Wickham, 1914
- Mordella subapicalis Pic, 1936
- Mordella subauratonotata Pic, 1924
- Mordella subfasciata Maeklin, 1875
- Mordella submaculata Ray, 1936
- Mordella subnotata Maeklin, 1875
- Mordella subobliquefasciata Pic, 1936
- Mordella subvittata W.J. Macleay, 1887
- Mordella sultiatronotata Pic, 1917
- Mordella summermanae Ray, 1939
- Mordella suturalis Fairmaire & Germain, 1863
- Mordella sydneyana Blackburn, 1893
- Mordella tabulae Franciscolo, 1965
- Mordella tachyporiformis Curtis, 1845
- Mordella tarsalis Lea, 1917
- Mordella teitteri Pic, 1936
- Mordella tenella Maeklin, 1875
- Mordella tenuicauda Nomura, 1958
- Mordella testacea Forster, 1771
- Mordella testaceipes Pic, 1936
- Mordella testaceohumeralis Pic, 1936
- Mordella tetraspilota Champion, 1891
- Mordella tetrastictoptera Lea, 1929
- Mordella thoracica Solier, 1851
- Mordella tijucaensis Pic, 1936
- Mordella tomentosa Boisduval, 1835
- Mordella trifasciata Pic, 1936
- Mordella trilobibasa Lea, 1929
- Mordella tristicula Maeklin, 1875
- Mordella tristis Lea, 1895
- Mordella turneri Franciscolo, 1965
- Mordella undosa W.J. Macleay, 1887
- Mordella v-aureum Lea, 1902
- Mordella v-fasciata Lea, 1895
- Mordella varienotata Píc, 1941
- Mordella vaureum Lea, 1902
- Mordella velutina Emery, 1876
- Mordella verdensis Pic, 1936
- Mordella vesconis Solier, 1851
- Mordella vestita Emery, 1876
- Mordella vidua Solier, 1851
- Mordella violacescens Philippi, 1864
- Mordella viridescens Costa, 1854
- Mordella viridis Pic, 1930
- Mordella waterhousei Champion, 1895
- Mordella wiburdi Lea, 1895
- Mordella xanthogastra Fairmaire & Germain, 1863
- Mordella yami Nomura, 1967
