= Philibert Germain =

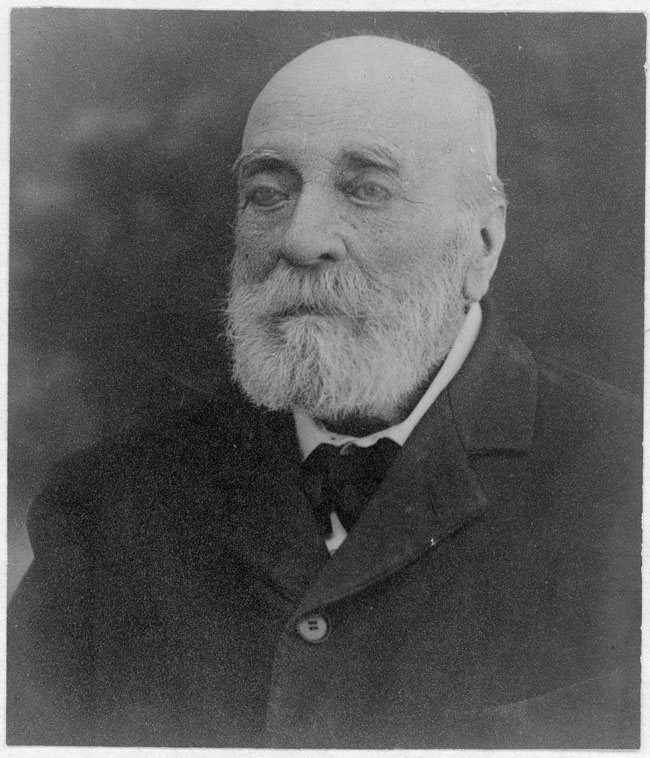
In 1913

Philibert Germain or Filiberto Germain in the Spanish form (25 January 1827 – 9 December 1913) was a French-born naturalist who worked in Chile and collected specimens across South America. He worked as a curator of entomology at the Museo Nacional in Santiago for some time. Several species including the orchid Habenaria germainii and the butterfly Tetraphlebia germainii are named after him.

== Life and work ==
Germain was born in Lyon He went to Chile in 1850 and became the director of the natural history museum in Santiago (Museo Nacional, Santiago) to succeed Claudio Gay (1800–1873) but he was demoted upon the appointment of Rudolf Amandus Philippi in 1853. He then resigned but continued to collect specimens from around South America for the museum and continued to work mainly on the beetles of the region. He also collected plant species from Chile, Brazil and Bolivia and sold specimens to museums in Europe. In 1889 he became a teacher at a school in Quillota and in 1893 he returned to work at the museum until his death.
