= Mordellistena mullahyi =

Scientific classification
- Domain: Eukaryota
- Kingdom: Animalia
- Phylum: Arthropoda
- Class: Insecta
- Order: Coleoptera
- Suborder: Polyphaga
- Infraorder: Cucujiformia
- Family: Mordellidae
- Genus: Mordellistena
- Species: M. mullahyi

Binomial name
- Mordellistena mullahyi Costa, 1971

Species of beetle

Mordellistena mullahyi is a species of beetle in the genus Mordellistena of the family Mordellidae, which is part of the superfamily Tenebrionoidea. It was discovered in 1971.
