= Mordellistena mediogemellata =

Scientific classification
- Domain: Eukaryota
- Kingdom: Animalia
- Phylum: Arthropoda
- Class: Insecta
- Order: Coleoptera
- Suborder: Polyphaga
- Infraorder: Cucujiformia
- Family: Mordellidae
- Genus: Mordellistena
- Species: M. mediogemellata

Binomial name
- Mordellistena mediogemellata Ermisch, 1977

Species of beetle

Mordellistena mediogemellata is a species of beetle in the family Mordellidae which is in the superfamily Tenebrionoidea. It was discovered in 1977 and can be found in Hungary and the European part of Turkey.
