= Glipidiomorpha intermedia =

Scientific classification
- Domain: Eukaryota
- Kingdom: Animalia
- Phylum: Arthropoda
- Class: Insecta
- Order: Coleoptera
- Suborder: Polyphaga
- Infraorder: Cucujiformia
- Family: Mordellidae
- Genus: Glipidiomorpha
- Species: G. intermedia

Binomial name
- Glipidiomorpha intermedia Franciscolo, 1955

Species of beetle

Glipidiomorpha intermedia is a species of beetle in the genus Glipidiomorpha of the family Mordellidae, which is part of the superfamily Tenebrionoidea. It was described in 1955 by Francisco.
