= Mordellistena mediana =

Scientific classification
- Domain: Eukaryota
- Kingdom: Animalia
- Phylum: Arthropoda
- Class: Insecta
- Order: Coleoptera
- Suborder: Polyphaga
- Infraorder: Cucujiformia
- Family: Mordellidae
- Genus: Mordellistena
- Species: M. mediana

Binomial name
- Mordellistena mediana Ermisch, 1977

Species of beetle

Mordellistena mediana is a species of beetle in the family Mordellidae which is in the superfamily Tenebrionoidea. It was discovered in 1977 and can be found in Croatia, Greece and Hungary.
