= Macrotomoxia palpalis =

Scientific classification
- Domain: Eukaryota
- Kingdom: Animalia
- Phylum: Arthropoda
- Class: Insecta
- Order: Coleoptera
- Suborder: Polyphaga
- Infraorder: Cucujiformia
- Family: Mordellidae
- Genus: Macrotomoxia
- Species: M. palpalis

Binomial name
- Macrotomoxia palpalis (Kôno, 1935)

Species of beetle

Macrotomoxia palpalis is a species of beetle in the genus Macrotomoxia of the family Mordellidae, which is part of the superfamily Tenebrionoidea. It was discovered in 1935.
