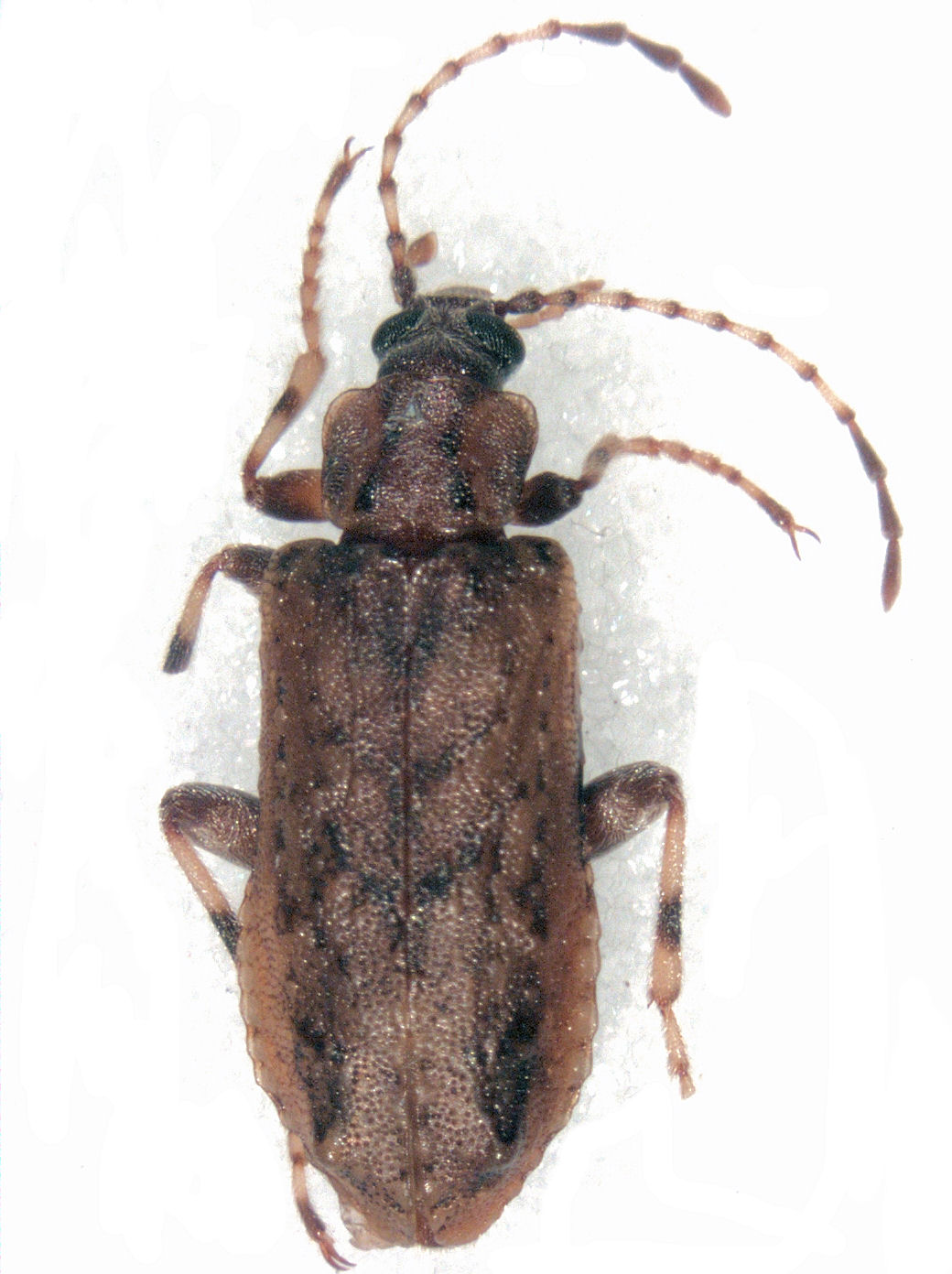
- Specimen of Onysius anomalus

Scientific classification
- Kingdom: Animalia
- Phylum: Arthropoda
- Clade: Pancrustacea
- Class: Insecta
- Order: Coleoptera
- Suborder: Polyphaga
- Infraorder: Cucujiformia
- Superfamily: Tenebrionoidea
- Family: Promecheilidae; Lacordaire, 1859

Synonyms
- Perimylopidae St. George, 1939

= Promecheilidae =

Family of beetles

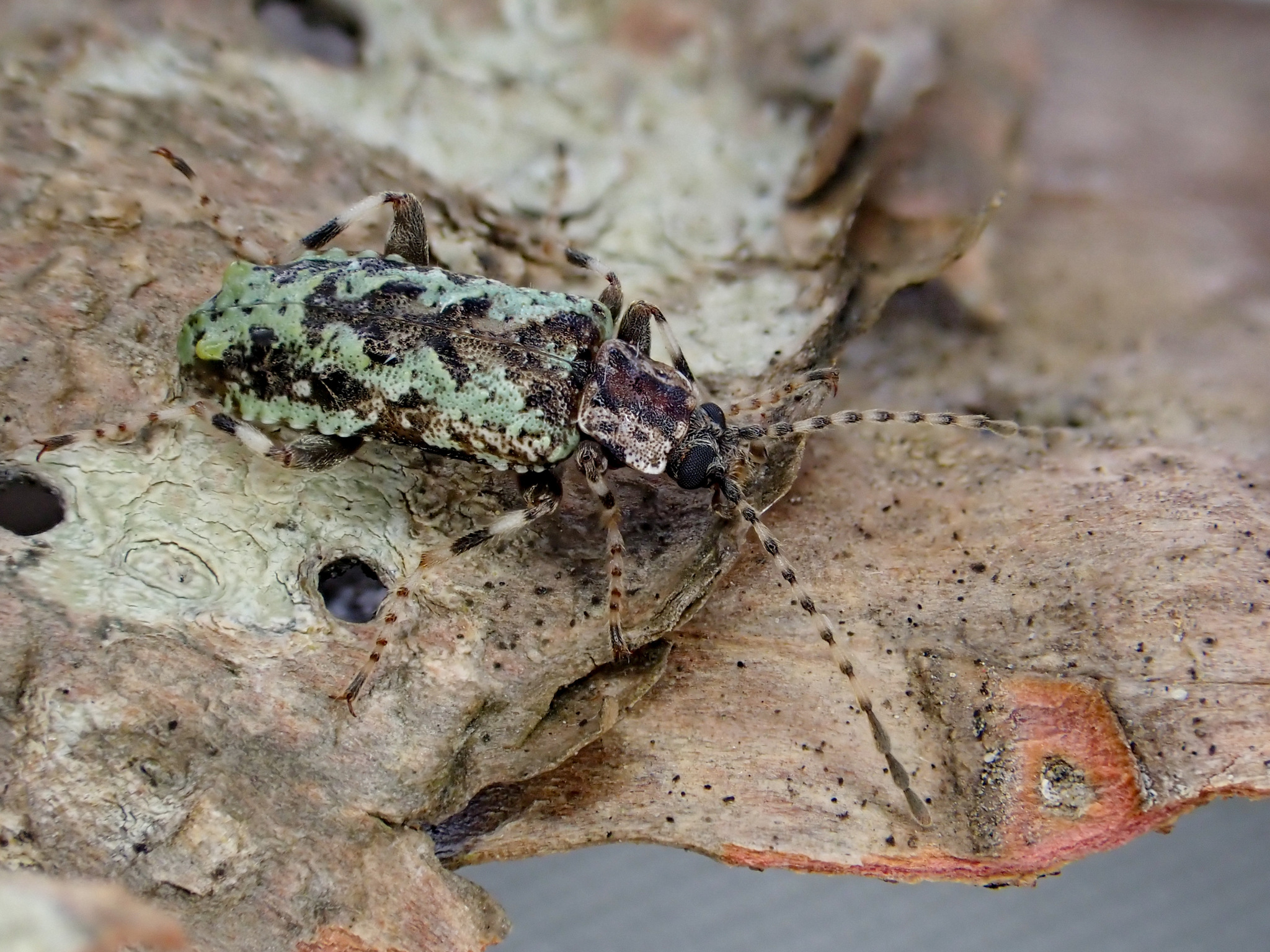
Onysius anomalus

Promecheilidae is a family of beetles in the superfamily Tenebrionoidea. Perimylopidae is considered a synonym. They are found in southern South America and associated archipelagos like South Georgia and the Falklands, New Zealand and Tasmania. Some species are associated tree ferns and moss-covered dead wood, and other forested habitats, while others are associated with peat bogs, grasslands and coastal habitats. They are probably phytophagus, feeding on lichen, moss, and other plant material.

Adult beetles have an 11 segmented antenna, the head is narrowed behind the eye. They have a tarsal formula of 5-5-4. The family is part of a clade that includes the Archeocrypticidae, Mycetophagidae, and Ulodidae.

== Genera ==
Genera in the family Promecheilidae include:

- Chanopterus Boheman, 1858 (Tierra del Fuego)
- Hydromedion Waterhouse, 1876 (Tierra del Fuego and South Georgia)
- Melytra Pascoe, 1869 (Tasmania)
- Onysius Broun, 1886 (New Zealand, formerly placed in Chalcodryidae)
- Parahelops Waterhouse, 1876 (southern Argentina and Chile, Falklands)
- Perimylops Müller, 1884 (South Georgia)
- Promecheilus Solier, 1851,2018 (Chile)
- Pseudodarwinella Ukrainsky, 2009 (=Darwinella Enderlein, 1912) (Falklands)
- Sirrhas Champion, 1893 (Tasmania)
