= Mordellistena hungarica =

Scientific classification
- Domain: Eukaryota
- Kingdom: Animalia
- Phylum: Arthropoda
- Class: Insecta
- Order: Coleoptera
- Suborder: Polyphaga
- Infraorder: Cucujiformia
- Family: Mordellidae
- Genus: Mordellistena
- Species: M. hungarica

Binomial name
- Mordellistena hungarica Ermisch, 1977

Species of beetle

Mordellistena hungarica is a species of beetle in the family Mordellidae which is in the superfamily Tenebrionoidea. It was described in 1977 by Ermisch and can be found in Croatia and Hungary.
