= Mordellistena meuseli =

Scientific classification
- Domain: Eukaryota
- Kingdom: Animalia
- Phylum: Arthropoda
- Class: Insecta
- Order: Coleoptera
- Suborder: Polyphaga
- Infraorder: Cucujiformia
- Family: Mordellidae
- Genus: Mordellistena
- Species: M. meuseli

Binomial name
- Mordellistena meuseli Ermisch, 1956

Synonyms
- Mordellistena minutuloides Ermisch, 1956

Species of beetle

Mordellistena meuseli is a species of beetle in the family Mordellidae which is in the superfamily Tenebrionoidea. It was discovered in 1956 and can be found in Austria, Czech Republic, France, Germany, Hungary, Slovakia and Ukraine.
