= Mordellistena horvathi =

Scientific classification
- Domain: Eukaryota
- Kingdom: Animalia
- Phylum: Arthropoda
- Class: Insecta
- Order: Coleoptera
- Suborder: Polyphaga
- Infraorder: Cucujiformia
- Family: Mordellidae
- Genus: Mordellistena
- Species: M. horvathi

Binomial name
- Mordellistena horvathi Ermisch, 1977

Species of beetle

Mordellistena horvathi is a species of beetle in the family Mordellidae which is in the superfamily Tenebrionoidea. It was described in 1977 by Ermisch and can be found in Bulgaria, Czech Republic, Hungary, Republic of Macedonia and Slovakia.
