= Klapperichimorda lutevittata =

Scientific classification
- Domain: Eukaryota
- Kingdom: Animalia
- Phylum: Arthropoda
- Class: Insecta
- Order: Coleoptera
- Suborder: Polyphaga
- Infraorder: Cucujiformia
- Family: Mordellidae
- Genus: Klapperichimorda
- Species: K. lutevittata

Binomial name
- Klapperichimorda lutevittata Fan & Yang, 1995

Species of beetle

Klapperichimorda lutevittata is a species of beetle in the genus Klapperichimorda of the family Mordellidae, which is part of the superfamily Tenebrionoidea. It was discovered in 1995.
