= Mordellistena krujanensis =

Scientific classification
- Domain: Eukaryota
- Kingdom: Animalia
- Phylum: Arthropoda
- Class: Insecta
- Order: Coleoptera
- Suborder: Polyphaga
- Infraorder: Cucujiformia
- Family: Mordellidae
- Genus: Mordellistena
- Species: M. krujanensis

Binomial name
- Mordellistena krujanensis Ermisch, 1963

Species of beetle

Mordellistena krujanensis is a species of beetle in the genus Mordellistena of the family Mordellidae, which is part of the superfamily Tenebrionoidea. It was described in 1963 by Ermisch.
