= Mordellistena microgemellata =

Scientific classification
- Domain: Eukaryota
- Kingdom: Animalia
- Phylum: Arthropoda
- Class: Insecta
- Order: Coleoptera
- Suborder: Polyphaga
- Infraorder: Cucujiformia
- Family: Mordellidae
- Genus: Mordellistena
- Species: M. microgemellata

Binomial name
- Mordellistena microgemellata Ermisch, 1965

Species of beetle

Mordellistena microgemellata is a species of beetle in the genus Mordellistena of the family Mordellidae, which is part of the superfamily Tenebrionoidea. It was discovered in 1965 and lives in such countries as Bulgaria, Greece and Cyprus.
