= Macrotomoxia castanea =

Scientific classification
- Domain: Eukaryota
- Kingdom: Animalia
- Phylum: Arthropoda
- Class: Insecta
- Order: Coleoptera
- Suborder: Polyphaga
- Infraorder: Cucujiformia
- Family: Mordellidae
- Genus: Macrotomoxia
- Species: M. kodadai

Binomial name
- Macrotomoxia kodadai Píc, 1922

Species of beetle

Macrotomoxia kodadai is a species of beetle in the genus Macrotomoxia of the family Mordellidae, which is part of the superfamily Tenebrionoidea. It was discovered in 1922.
