= Phungia =

Scientific classification
- Kingdom: Animalia
- Phylum: Arthropoda
- Class: Insecta
- Order: Coleoptera
- Suborder: Polyphaga
- Infraorder: Cucujiformia
- Superfamily: Tenebrionoidea
- Family: Mordellidae
- Subfamily: Mordellinae
- Tribe: Mordellini
- Genus: Phungia; Pic, 1922

Synonyms
- Calycellina Pic, 1932; Dollmania Franciscolo, 1961

Genus of beetles

Phungia is a genus of tumbling flower beetles in the family Mordellidae.

== Species ==
These species belong to the genus Phungia.

- Phungia borneensis (Blair, 1922)
- Phungia camerunensis Ermisch, 1950
- Phungia pic
- Phungia rufa Pic, 1922
- Phungia scraptiiformis (Franciscolo, 1961)
- Phungia sudanensis (Ermisch, 1968)
- Phungia trotommoides (Franciscolo, 1962)
