= Mordellistena minima =

Scientific classification
- Domain: Eukaryota
- Kingdom: Animalia
- Phylum: Arthropoda
- Class: Insecta
- Order: Coleoptera
- Suborder: Polyphaga
- Infraorder: Cucujiformia
- Family: Mordellidae
- Genus: Mordellistena
- Species: M. meuseli

Binomial name
- Mordellistena meuseli Costa, 1854

Synonyms
- Mordellistena pseudorhenana Ermisch, 1977

Species of beetle

Mordellistena minima is a species of beetle in the family Mordellidae which is in the superfamily Tenebrionoidea. It was discovered in 1854 and can be found in Europe, Near East and North Africa. In Europe, it can be found on such islands as Balearic, Corsica, and Sicily, and in such mainland countries as Bulgaria, France, Greece, Hungary, Spain, all states of former Yugoslavia (except for Bosnia and Herzegovina and Slovenia), and in European part of Turkey.
