= Mordellistena miyamotoi =

Scientific classification
- Domain: Eukaryota
- Kingdom: Animalia
- Phylum: Arthropoda
- Class: Insecta
- Order: Coleoptera
- Suborder: Polyphaga
- Infraorder: Cucujiformia
- Family: Mordellidae
- Genus: Mordellistena
- Species: M. miyamotoi

Binomial name
- Mordellistena miyamotoi Costa, 1956

Species of beetle

Mordellistena miyamotoi is a species of beetle in the genus Mordellistena of the family Mordellidae, which is part of the superfamily Tenebrionoidea. It was discovered in 1956.
