= Mordellistena olympica =

Scientific classification
- Kingdom: Animalia
- Phylum: Arthropoda
- Clade: Pancrustacea
- Class: Insecta
- Order: Coleoptera
- Suborder: Polyphaga
- Infraorder: Cucujiformia
- Family: Mordellidae
- Genus: Mordellistena
- Species: M. olympica

Binomial name
- Mordellistena olympica Ermisch, 1965

Species of beetle

Mordellistena olympica is a species of beetle in the genus Mordellistena of the family Mordellidae, which is part of the superfamily Tenebrionoidea. It was discovered in 1965 and can be found in such countries as Bulgaria, Greece, Kosovo, Montenegro, Serbia, North Macedonia, and Voivodina.
