= Mordellistena micans =

Scientific classification
- Domain: Eukaryota
- Kingdom: Animalia
- Phylum: Arthropoda
- Class: Insecta
- Order: Coleoptera
- Suborder: Polyphaga
- Infraorder: Cucujiformia
- Family: Mordellidae
- Genus: Mordellistena
- Species: M. micans

Binomial name
- Mordellistena micans (Germar, 1817)

Synonyms
- Mordella micans; Mordellistena infima Emery, 1876

Species of beetle

Mordellistena micans is a species of beetle in the family Mordellidae, part of the superfamily Tenebrionoidea. It was discovered in 1817 and can be found in Austria, Bosnia and Herzegovina, Croatia, Hungary, Italy, Slovenia, Spain, and European part of Turkey.
