= Mordellistena mihoki =

Scientific classification
- Domain: Eukaryota
- Kingdom: Animalia
- Phylum: Arthropoda
- Class: Insecta
- Order: Coleoptera
- Suborder: Polyphaga
- Infraorder: Cucujiformia
- Family: Mordellidae
- Genus: Mordellistena
- Species: M. mihoki

Binomial name
- Mordellistena mihoki Ermisch, 1977

Species of beetle

Mordellistena mihoki is a species of beetle in the Mordellistena of the family Mordellidae, which is part of the superfamily Tenebrionoidea. It was discovered in 1977, and can be found in such countries as Croatia, Germany, Hungary, Romania, and Ukraine.
