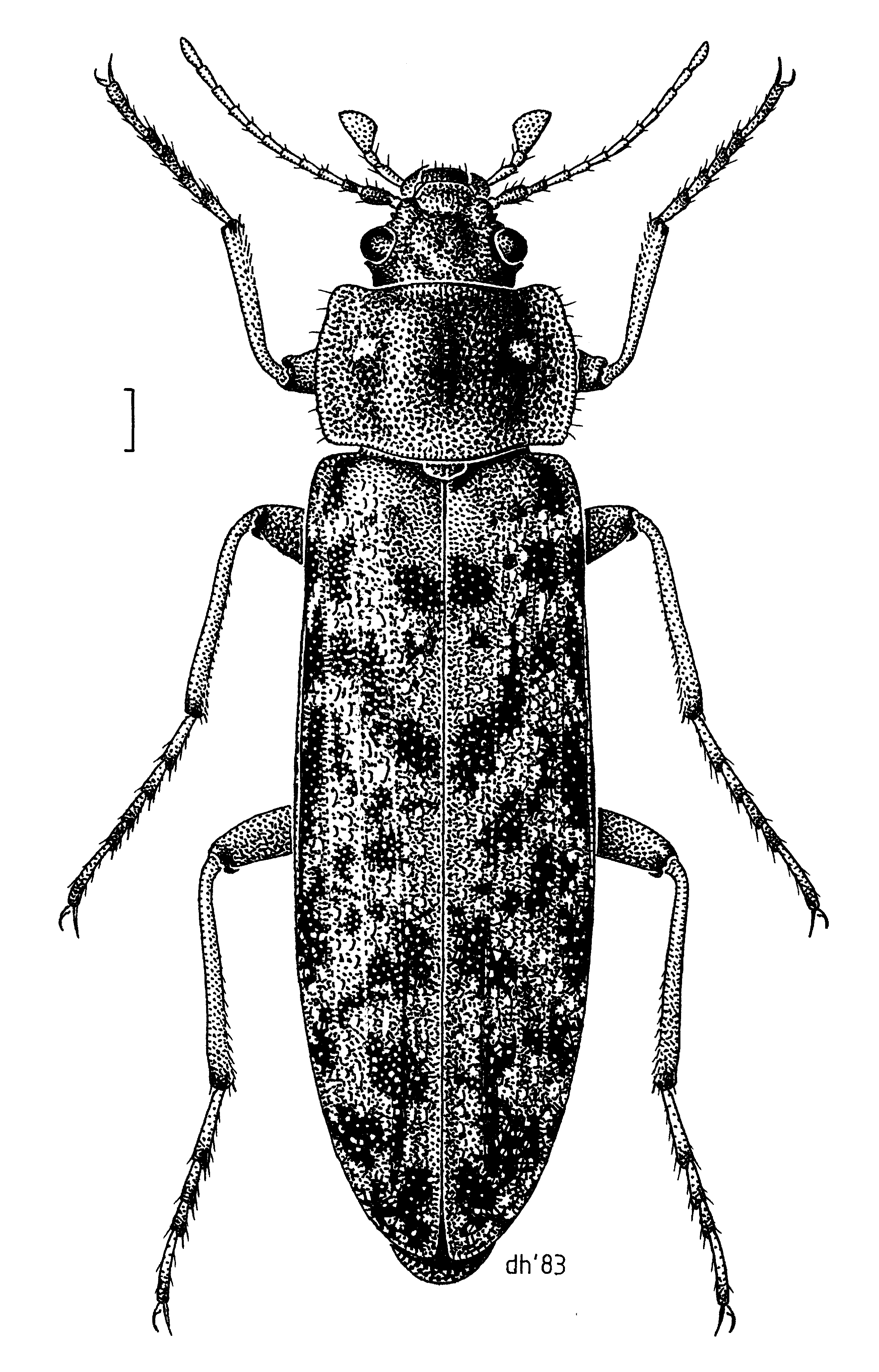
- Chalcodrya variegata

Scientific classification
- Kingdom: Animalia
- Phylum: Arthropoda
- Clade: Pancrustacea
- Class: Insecta
- Order: Coleoptera
- Suborder: Polyphaga
- Infraorder: Cucujiformia
- Superfamily: Tenebrionoidea
- Family: Chalcodryidae; Watt, 1974

= Chalcodryidae =

Family of beetles

The Chalcodryidae are a family of beetles in the superfamily Tenebrionoidea. It contains at least five species in two genera Chalcodrya and Philpottia, which are endemic to New Zealand. They are generally found associated with moss or lichen covered branches, with the larvae having been found to be associated with dead twigs. They are likely noctural, feeding on lichen and other plant material at night. The genera Sirrhas and Onysius, formerly placed in this family, have subsequently been transferred to Promecheilidae.

== Taxonomy ==
It contains these genera and species:

- Genus Chalcodrya Redtenbacher, 1868
  - Chalcodrya hilaris Watt, 1974
  - Chalcodrya variegata Redtenbacher, 1868
- Genus Philpottia Broun, 1915
  - Philpottia levinotis Watt, 1974
  - Philpottia mollis (Broun, 1886)
