= Phungia rufa =

Scientific classification
- Domain: Eukaryota
- Kingdom: Animalia
- Phylum: Arthropoda
- Class: Insecta
- Order: Coleoptera
- Suborder: Polyphaga
- Infraorder: Cucujiformia
- Family: Mordellidae
- Genus: Phungia
- Species: P. rufa

Binomial name
- Phungia rufa Ermisch, 1922

Synonyms
- Calycella rufa Pic, 1932

Species of beetle

Phungia rufa is a species of beetle in the genus Phungia of the family Mordellidae. It was described in 1922.
