= Glipidiomorpha obsoleta =

Scientific classification
- Domain: Eukaryota
- Kingdom: Animalia
- Phylum: Arthropoda
- Class: Insecta
- Order: Coleoptera
- Suborder: Polyphaga
- Infraorder: Cucujiformia
- Family: Mordellidae
- Genus: Glipidiomorpha
- Species: G. obsoleta

Binomial name
- Glipidiomorpha obsoleta Franciscolo, 1955

Species of beetle

Glipidiomorpha obsoleta is a species of beetle in the genus Glipidiomorpha of the family Mordellidae. It was described in 1955 by Franciscolo.
