= Glipidiomorpha ideodorsalis =

Scientific classification
- Domain: Eukaryota
- Kingdom: Animalia
- Phylum: Arthropoda
- Class: Insecta
- Order: Coleoptera
- Suborder: Polyphaga
- Infraorder: Cucujiformia
- Family: Mordellidae
- Genus: Glipidiomorpha
- Species: G. ideodorsalis

Binomial name
- Glipidiomorpha ideodorsalis Franciscolo, 1955

Species of beetle

Glipidiomorpha ideodorsalis is a species of beetle in the genus Glipidiomorpha of the family Mordellidae. It was described in 1955 by Mario E. Franciscolo.
