= Klapperichimorda =

Scientific classification
- Domain: Eukaryota
- Kingdom: Animalia
- Phylum: Arthropoda
- Class: Insecta
- Order: Coleoptera
- Suborder: Polyphaga
- Infraorder: Cucujiformia
- Family: Mordellidae
- Subfamily: Mordellinae
- Tribe: Mordellini
- Genus: Klapperichimorda; Ermisch, 1968
- Species: K. shibatai

Binomial name
- Klapperichimorda shibatai Kiyoyama, 2008

Genus of beetles

Klapperichimorda is a genus of tumbling flower beetles in the family Mordellidae, found in temperate Asia.

== Species ==
These species belong to the genus Klapperichimorda.

- Klapperichimorda kodadai Horák, 1996
- Klapperichimorda lutevittata Fan & Yang, 1995
- Klapperichimorda quadrimaculata Ermisch, 1968
- Klapperichimorda shibatai Kiyoyama, 2008
