= Glipidiomorpha riesei =

Scientific classification
- Domain: Eukaryota
- Kingdom: Animalia
- Phylum: Arthropoda
- Class: Insecta
- Order: Coleoptera
- Suborder: Polyphaga
- Infraorder: Cucujiformia
- Family: Mordellidae
- Genus: Glipidiomorpha
- Species: G. riesei

Binomial name
- Glipidiomorpha riesei Franciscolo, 2001

Species of beetle

Glipidiomorpha riesei is a species of beetle in the genus Glipidiomorpha of the family Mordellidae. It was described in 2001 by Franciscolo.
