= Glipidiomorpha burgeoni =

Scientific classification
- Domain: Eukaryota
- Kingdom: Animalia
- Phylum: Arthropoda
- Class: Insecta
- Order: Coleoptera
- Suborder: Polyphaga
- Infraorder: Cucujiformia
- Family: Mordellidae
- Genus: Glipidiomorpha
- Species: G. burgeoni

Binomial name
- Glipidiomorpha burgeoni Píc, 1929

Species of beetle

Glipidiomorpha burgeoni is a species of beetle in the genus Glipidiomorpha of the family Mordellidae. It was described in 1929 by Píc.
