= Macrotomoxia gardneri =

Scientific classification
- Kingdom: Animalia
- Phylum: Arthropoda
- Class: Insecta
- Order: Coleoptera
- Suborder: Polyphaga
- Infraorder: Cucujiformia
- Family: Mordellidae
- Subfamily: Mordellinae
- Tribe: Mordellini
- Genus: Macrotomoxia
- Species: M. gardneri

Binomial name
- Macrotomoxia gardneri (Blair, 1931)

Synonyms
- Calycina gardneri Blair, 1931

Species of beetle

Macrotomoxia gardneri is a species of tumbling flower beetles in the family Mordellidae. It is found in south and southeast Asia.
