= Phungia scraptiiformis =

Scientific classification
- Domain: Eukaryota
- Kingdom: Animalia
- Phylum: Arthropoda
- Class: Insecta
- Order: Coleoptera
- Suborder: Polyphaga
- Infraorder: Cucujiformia
- Family: Mordellidae
- Genus: Phungia
- Species: P. scraptiiformis

Binomial name
- Phungia scraptiiformis (Franciscolo, 1961)

Synonyms
- Dollmania scraptiiformis Franciscolo, 1961

Species of beetle

Phungia scraptiiformis is a species of beetle in the genus Phungia of the family Mordellidae. It was described in 1961.
