= Glipidiomorpha astrolabii =

Scientific classification
- Domain: Eukaryota
- Kingdom: Animalia
- Phylum: Arthropoda
- Class: Insecta
- Order: Coleoptera
- Suborder: Polyphaga
- Infraorder: Cucujiformia
- Family: Mordellidae
- Genus: Glipidiomorpha
- Species: G. astrolabii

Binomial name
- Glipidiomorpha astrolabii Franciscolo, 1952

Species of beetle

Glipidiomorpha astrolabii is a species of beetle in the genus Glipidiomorpha of the family Mordellidae. It was described in 1952 by Franciscolo.
