= Arthropod leg =

Form of jointed appendage of arthropods

The arthropod leg is a form of jointed appendage of arthropods, usually used for walking. Many of the terms used for arthropod leg segments (called podomeres) are of Latin origin, and may be confused with terms for bones: coxa (meaning hip, pl.: coxae), trochanter, femur (pl.: femora), tibia (pl.: tibiae), tarsus (pl.: tarsi), ischium (pl.: ischia), metatarsus, carpus, dactylus (meaning finger), patella (pl.: patellae).

Homologies of leg segments between groups are difficult to prove and are the source of much argument. Some authors posit up to eleven segments per leg for the most recent common ancestor of extant arthropods but modern arthropods have eight or fewer. It has been argued that the ancestral leg need not have been so complex, and that other events, such as successive loss of function of a Hox-gene, could result in parallel gains of leg segments.

In arthropods, each of the leg segments articulates with the next segment in a hinge joint and may only bend in one plane. This means that a greater number of segments is required to achieve the same kinds of movements that are possible in vertebrate animals, which have rotational ball-and-socket joints at the base of the fore and hind limbs.

== Biramous and uniramous ==
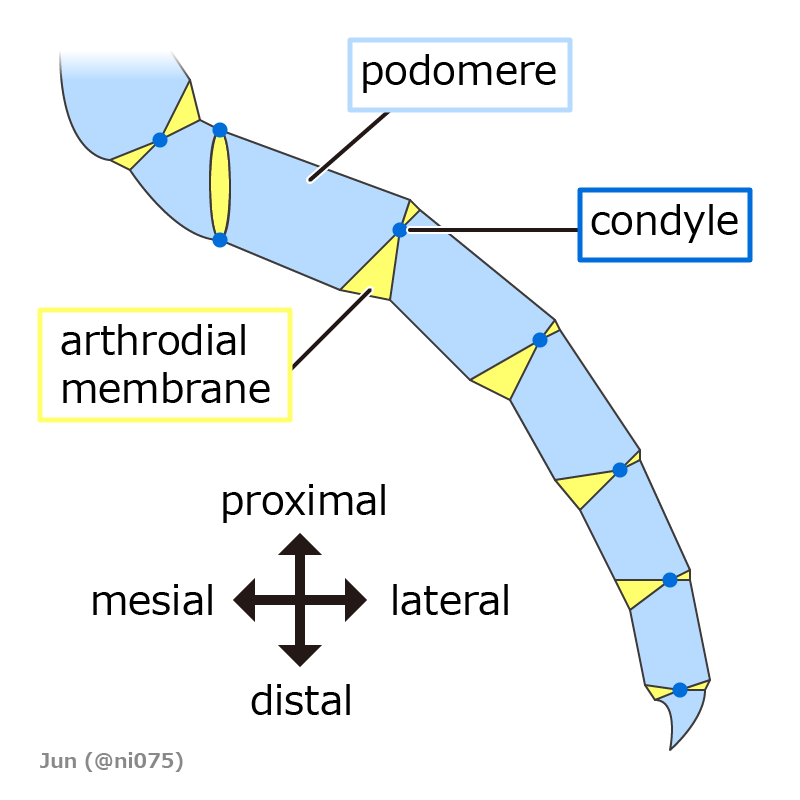
Uniramous

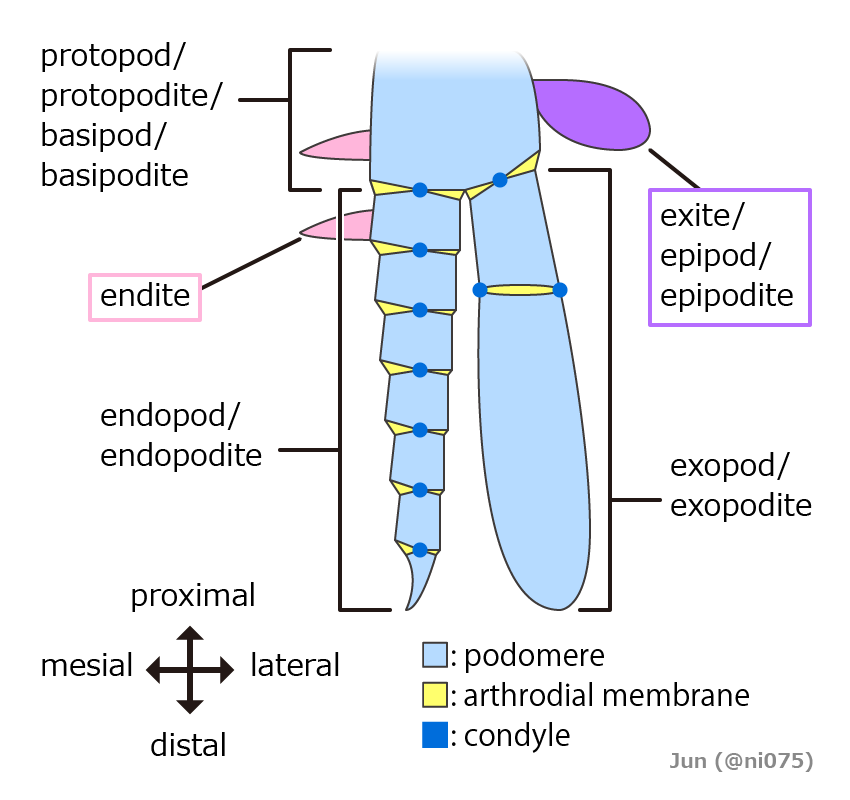
Biramous

Generalized external morphology of uniramous and biramous appendages

The appendages of arthropods may be either biramous or uniramous. A uniramous limb comprises a single series of segments attached end-to-end. A biramous limb, however, branches into two, and each branch consists of a series of segments attached end-to-end.

The external branch (ramus) of the appendages of crustaceans is known as the exopod or exopodite, while the internal branch is known as the endopod or endopodite. Other structures aside from the latter two are termed exites (outer structures) and endites (inner structures). Exopodites can be easily distinguished from exites by the possession of internal musculature. The exopodites can sometimes be missing in some crustacean groups (amphipods and isopods), and they are completely absent in insects.

The legs of insects and myriapods are uniramous. In crustaceans, the first antennae are uniramous, but the second antennae are biramous, as are the legs in most species.

For a time, possession of uniramous limbs was believed to be a shared, derived character, so uniramous arthropods were grouped into a taxon called Uniramia. It is now believed that several groups of arthropods evolved uniramous limbs independently from ancestors with biramous limbs, so this taxon is no longer used.

== Chelicerata ==
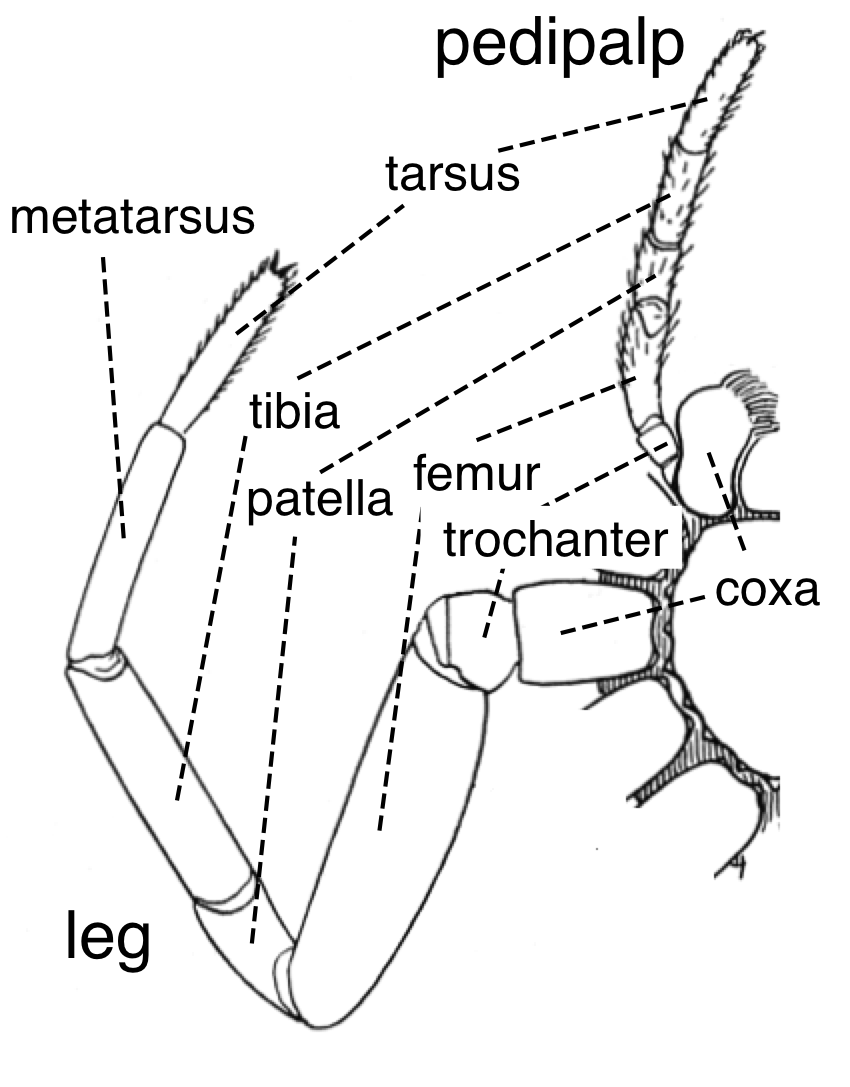
Diagram of a spider leg and pedipalp – the pedipalp has one fewer segment

Arachnid legs differ from those of insects by the addition of two segments on either side of the tibia, the patella between the femur and the tibia, and the metatarsus (sometimes called basitarsus) between the tibia and the tarsus (sometimes called telotarsus), making a total of seven segments.

The tarsus of spiders has claws at the end as well as a hook that helps with web-spinning. Spider legs can also serve sensory functions, with hairs that serve as touch receptors, as well as an organ on the tarsus that serves as a humidity receptor, known as the tarsal organ.

The situation is identical in scorpions, but with the addition of a pre-tarsus beyond the tarsus. The claws of the scorpion are not truly legs, but are pedipalps, a different kind of appendage that is also found in spiders and is specialised for predation and mating.

In Limulus, there are no metatarsi or pretarsi, leaving six segments per leg.

== Crustacea ==
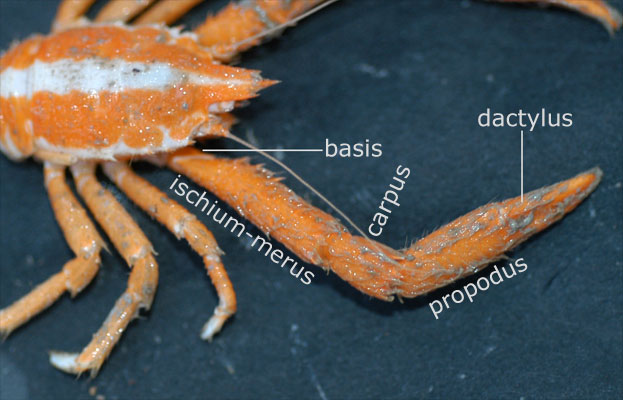
The leg of a squat lobster, showing the segments; the ischium and merus are fused in many decapods

The legs of crustaceans are divided into seven segments, which do not follow the naming system used in the other groups. They are: coxa, basis, ischium, merus, carpus, propodus, and dactylus. In some groups, some of the limb segments may be fused together. The claw (chela) of a lobster or crab is formed by the articulation of the dactylus against an outgrowth of the propodus. Crustacean limbs also differ in being biramous, whereas all other extant arthropods have uniramous limbs.

=== Coxa ===
The coxa is the proximal segment and functional base of the leg. Together with the following segment (basis) the coxa forms the protopod. Depending on the appendage, the coxa may bear an epipodite, gill (podobranch), or gonopore.

=== Basis ===
The basis is the second segment of the leg. It forms the distal segment of the protopod and bears variously developed branches (endopod, exopod). The basis may also be fused to following segment (ischium) to form ischiobasis. Basis is synonymous with basipodite.

=== Ischium ===
The ischium is the third segment of the leg. It forms the proximal segment of the endopod. The ischium may be fused with basis to form ischiobasis or with merus to form ischiomerus. Ischium is synonymous with ischiopod and ischiopodite

=== Merus ===
The merus is the fourth segment of the leg. It is the third movable segment and is the second most proximal segment of the endopod. Merus is synonymous with meropod and meropodite.

=== Carpus ===
The carpus is the fifth segment of the leg. It is the fourth movable segment and the middle segment of the endopod. In some amphipods, the carpus may form part of subchela (i.e., dactyl and propodus bearing down on carpus). Carpus is synonymous with carpopodite.

=== Propodus ===
The propodus is the sixth segment of the leg. It is the fifth moveable segment and the second most proximal segment of the endopod. In some crustaceans the propodus may be greatly enlarged to form subchela or chela (claws) together with the dactylus. Propodus is synonymous with propodite.

=== Dactylus ===
The dactylus is the seventh and most distal of the leg. In some crustaceans it may form the moveable distal element in the claw. Dactylus is synonymous with dactyl.

== Myriapoda ==
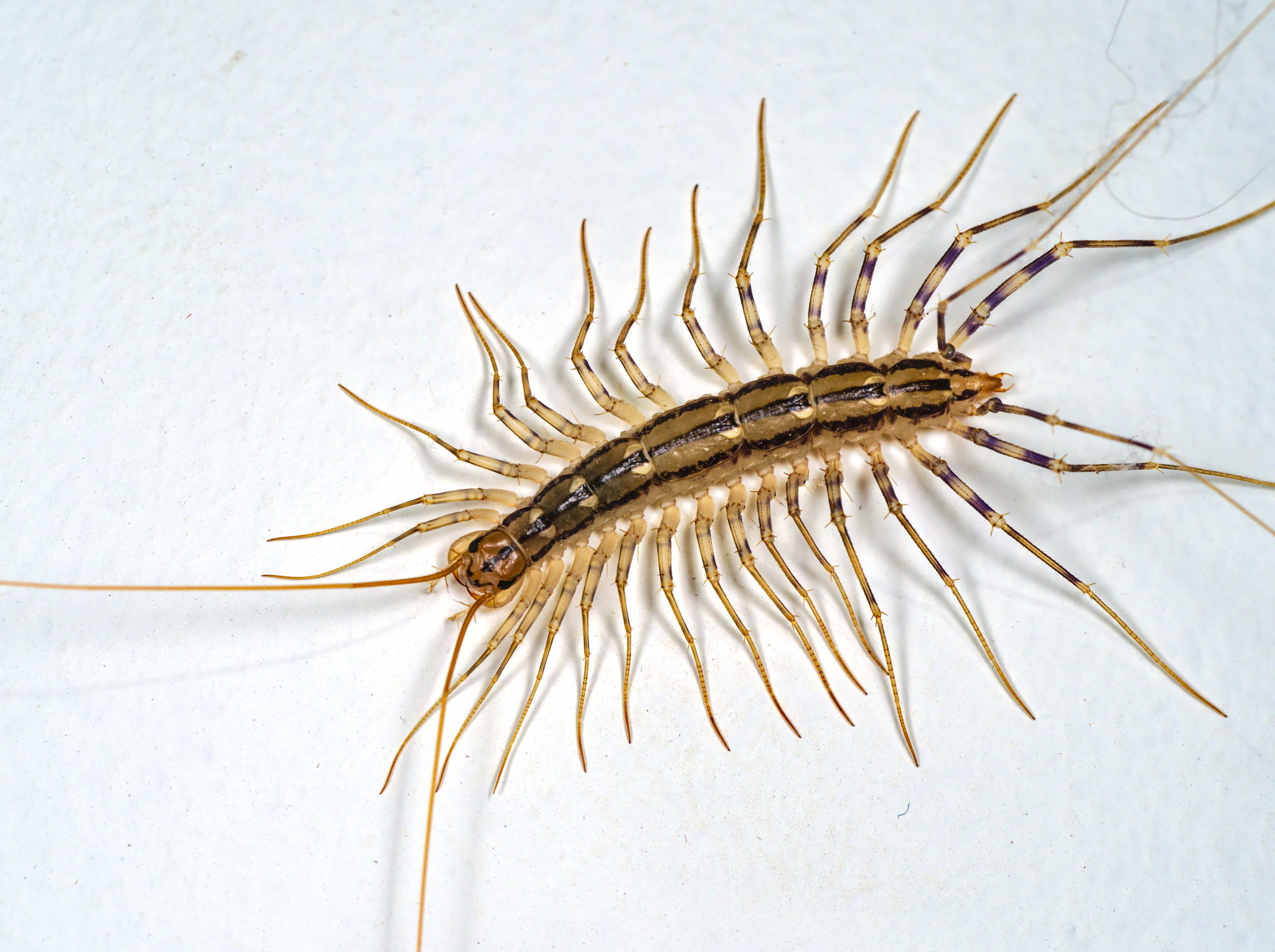
Seven-segmented legs of Scutigera coleoptrata

Myriapods (millipedes, centipedes and their relatives) have seven-segmented walking legs, comprising coxa, trochanter, prefemur, femur, tibia, tarsus, and a tarsal claw. Myriapod legs show a variety of modifications in different groups. In all centipedes, the first pair of legs is modified into a pair of venomous fangs called forcipules. In most millipedes, one or two pairs of walking legs in adult males are modified into sperm-transferring structures called gonopods. In some millipedes, the first leg pair in males may be reduced to tiny hooks or stubs, while in others the first pair may be enlarged.

== Insects ==
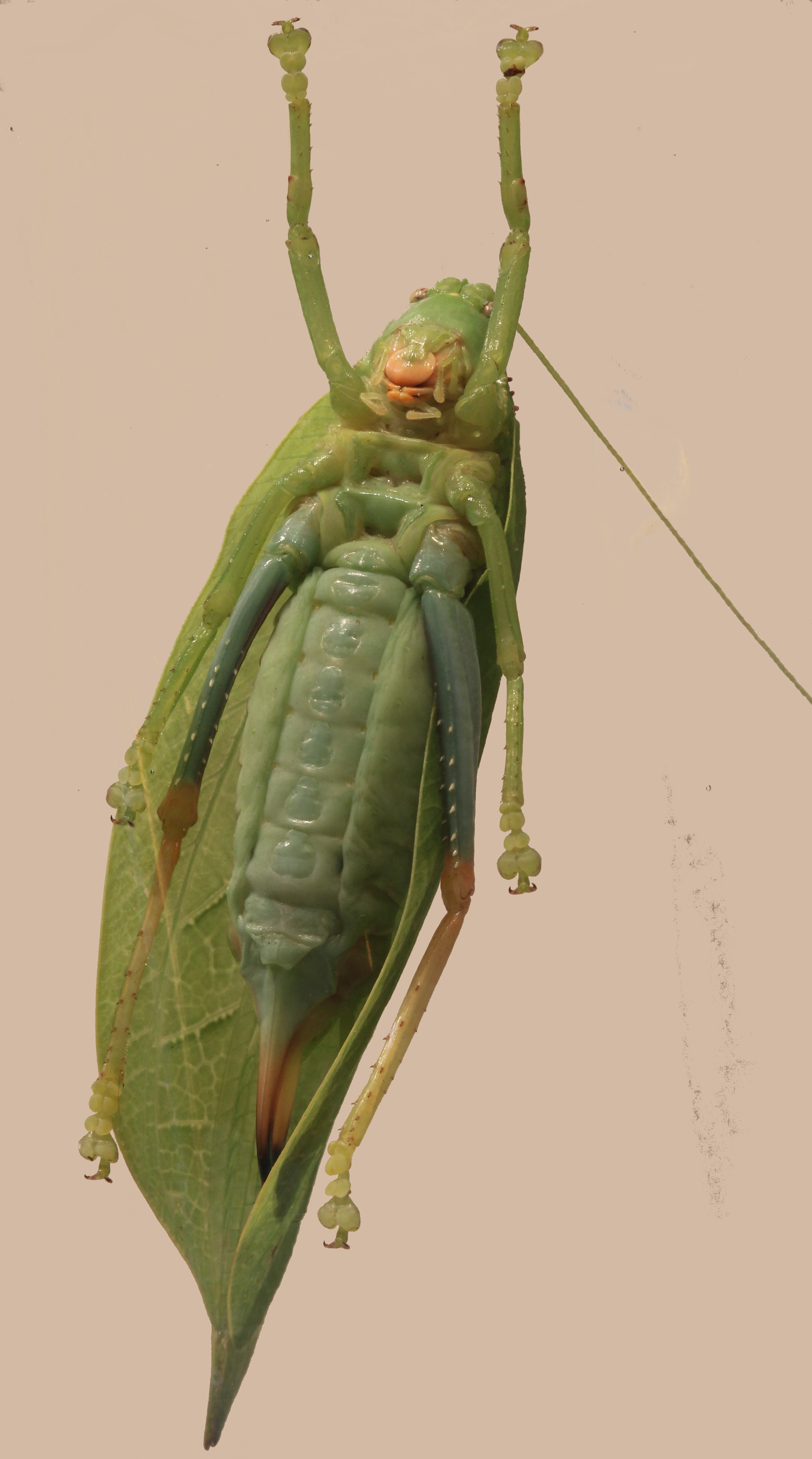
Zabalius aridus showing full leg anatomy, including plantulae under each tarsomere

Insects and their relatives are hexapods, having six legs, connected to the thorax, each with five components. In order from the body they are the coxa, trochanter, femur, tibia, and tarsus. Each is a single segment, except the tarsus which can be from three to seven segments, each referred to as a tarsomere.

Except in species in which legs have been lost or become vestigial through evolutionary adaptation, adult insects have six legs, one pair attached to each of the three segments of the thorax. They have paired appendages on some other segments, in particular, mouthparts, antennae and cerci, all of which are derived from paired legs on each segment of some common ancestor.

Some larval insects do however have extra walking legs on their abdominal segments; these extra legs are called prolegs. They are found most frequently on the larvae of moths and sawflies. Prolegs do not have the same structure as modern adult insect legs, and there has been a great deal of debate as to whether they are homologous with them. Current evidence suggests that they are indeed homologous up to a very primitive stage in their embryological development, but that their emergence in modern insects was not homologous between the Lepidoptera and Symphyta. Such concepts are pervasive in current interpretations of phylogeny.

In general, the legs of larval insects, particularly in the Endopterygota, vary more than in the adults. As mentioned, some have prolegs as well as "true" thoracic legs. Some have no externally visible legs at all (though they have internal rudiments that emerge as adult legs at the final ecdysis). Examples include the maggots of flies or grubs of weevils. In contrast, the larvae of other Coleoptera, such as the Scarabaeidae and Dytiscidae have thoracic legs, but no prolegs. Some insects that exhibit hypermetamorphosis begin their metamorphosis as planidia, specialised, active, legged larvae, but they end their larval stage as legless maggots, for example the Acroceridae.

Among the Exopterygota, the legs of larvae tend to resemble those of the adults in general, except in adaptations to their respective modes of life. For example, the legs of most immature Ephemeroptera are adapted to scuttling beneath underwater stones and the like, whereas the adults have more gracile legs that are less of a burden during flight. Again, the young of the Coccoidea are called "crawlers" and they crawl around looking for a good place to feed, where they settle down and stay for life. Their later instars have no functional legs in most species. Among the Apterygota, the legs of immature specimens are in effect smaller versions of the adult legs.

=== Fundamental morphology of insect legs ===
Diagram of a typical insect leg

A representative insect leg, such as that of a housefly or cockroach, has the following parts, in sequence from most proximal to most distal: coxa, trochanter, femur, tibia, tarsus, and pretarsus.

Associated with the leg itself there are various sclerites around its base. Their functions are articular and have to do with how the leg attaches to the main exoskeleton of the insect. Such sclerites differ considerably between unrelated insects.

==== Coxa ====
The coxa is the proximal segment and functional base of the leg. It articulates with the pleuron and associated sclerites of its thoracic segment, and in some species it articulates with the edge of the sternite as well. The homologies of the various basal sclerites are open to debate. Some authorities suggest that they derive from an ancestral subcoxa. In many species, the coxa has two lobes where it articulates with the pleuron. The posterior lobe is the meron which is usually the larger part of the coxa. A meron is well developed in Periplaneta, the Isoptera, Neuroptera and Lepidoptera.

==== Trochanter ====
The trochanter articulates with the coxa but usually is attached rigidly to the femur. In some insects, its appearance may be confusing; for example it has two subsegments in the Odonata. In parasitic Hymenoptera, the base of the femur has the appearance of a second trochanter.

==== Femur ====
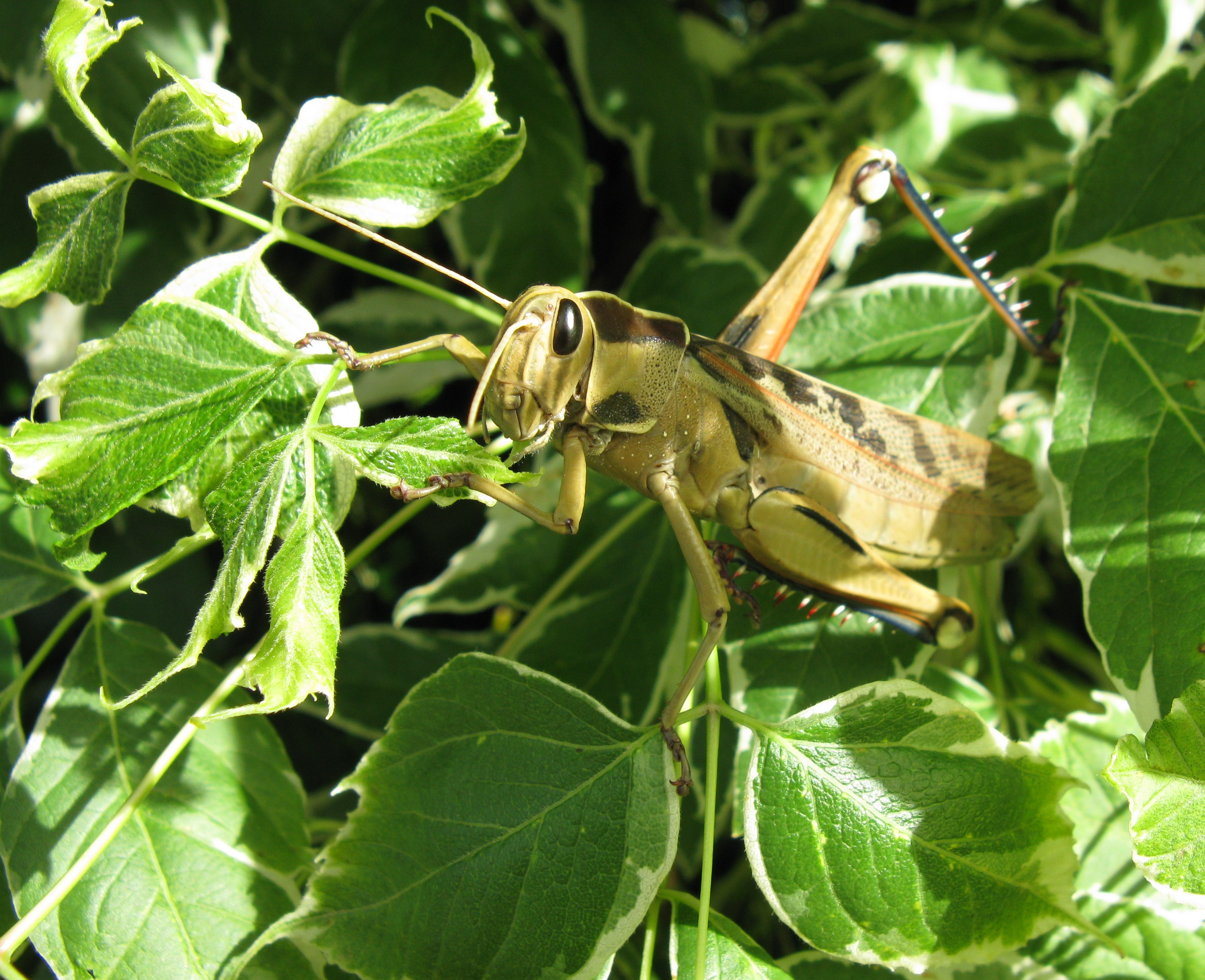
Acanthacris ruficornis, legs saltatorial, femora with bipennate muscle attachments, spines on tibiae painfully effective in a defensive kick

In most insects, the femur is the largest region of the leg; it is especially conspicuous in many insects with saltatorial legs because the typical leaping mechanism is to straighten the joint between the femur and the tibia, and the femur contains the necessary massive bipennate musculature.

==== Tibia ====
The tibia is the fourth section of the typical insect leg. As a rule, the tibia of an insect is slender in comparison to the femur, but it generally is at least as long and often longer. Near the distal end, there is generally a tibial spur, often two or more. In the Apocrita, the tibia of the foreleg bears a large apical spur that fits over a semicircular gap in the first segment of the tarsus. The gap is lined with comb-like bristles, and the insect cleans its antennae by drawing them through.

==== Tarsus ====
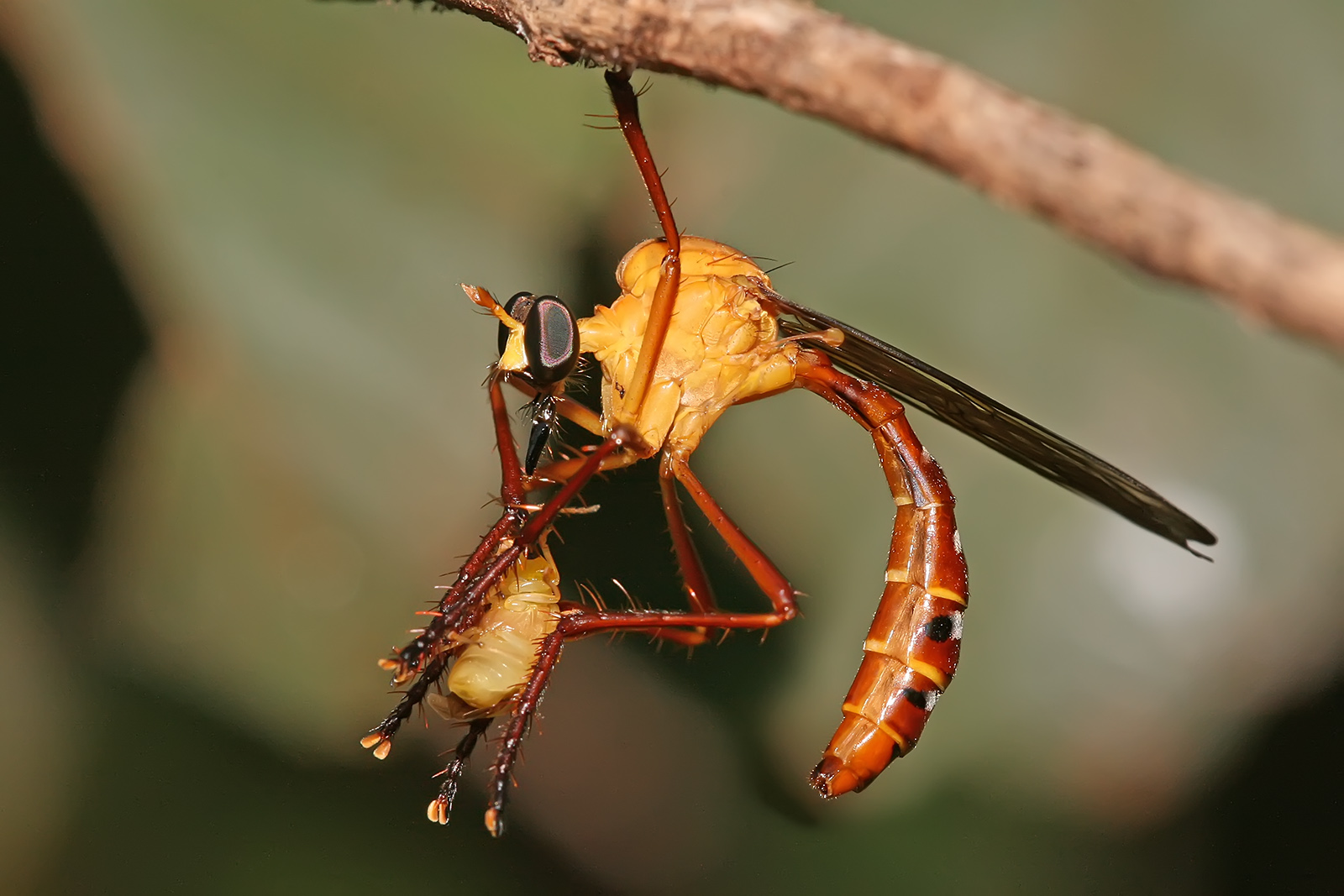
Robber fly (Asilidae), showing tarsomeres and pretarsi with ungues, pulvilli and empodia

The ancestral tarsus was a single segment and in the extant Protura, Diplura and certain insect larvae the tarsus also is single-segmented. Most modern insects have tarsi divided into subsegments (tarsomeres), usually about five. The actual number varies with the taxon, which may be useful for diagnostic purposes. For example, the Pterogeniidae characteristically have 5-segmented fore- and mid-tarsi, but 4-segmented hind tarsi, whereas the Cerylonidae have four tarsomeres on each tarsus.

The distal segment of the typical insect leg is the pretarsus. In the Collembola, Protura and many insect larvae, the pretarsus is a single claw. On the pretarsus most insects have a pair of claws (ungues, singular unguis). Between the ungues, a median unguitractor plate supports the pretarsus. The plate is attached to the apodeme of the flexor muscle of the ungues. In the Neoptera, the parempodia are a symmetrical pair of structures arising from the outside (distal) surface of the unguitractor plate between the claws. It is present in many Hemiptera and almost all Heteroptera. Usually, the parempodia are bristly (setiform), but in a few species they are fleshy. Sometimes the parempodia are reduced in size so as to almost disappear. Above the unguitractor plate, the pretarsus expands forward into a median lobe, the arolium.

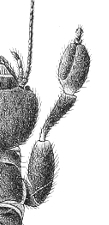
Webspinner, Embia major, front leg showing enlarged tarsomere, which contains the silk-spinning organs

Webspinners (Embioptera) have an enlarged basal tarsomere on each of the front legs, containing the silk-producing glands.

Under their pretarsi, members of the Diptera generally have paired lobes or pulvilli, meaning "little cushions". There is a single pulvillus below each unguis. The pulvilli often have an arolium between them or otherwise a median bristle or empodium, meaning the meeting place of the pulvilli. On the underside of the tarsal segments, there frequently are pulvillus-like organs or plantulae. The arolium, plantulae and pulvilli are adhesive organs enabling their possessors to climb smooth or steep surfaces. They all are outgrowths of the exoskeleton and their cavities contain Hemolymph. Their structures are covered with tubular tenent hairs, the apices of which are moistened by a glandular secretion. The organs are adapted to apply the hairs closely to a smooth surface so that adhesion occurs through surface molecular forces.

Insects control the ungues through muscle tension on a long tendon, the "retractor unguis" or "long tendon". In insect models of locomotion and motor control, such as Drosophila (Diptera), locusts (Acrididae), or stick insects (Phasmatodea), the long tendon courses through the tarsus and tibia before reaching the femur. Tension on the long tendon is controlled by two muscles, one in the femur and one in the tibia, which can operate differently depending on how the leg is bent. Tension on the long tendon controls the claw, but also bends the tarsus and likely affects its stiffness during walking.

=== Variations in functional anatomy of insect legs ===
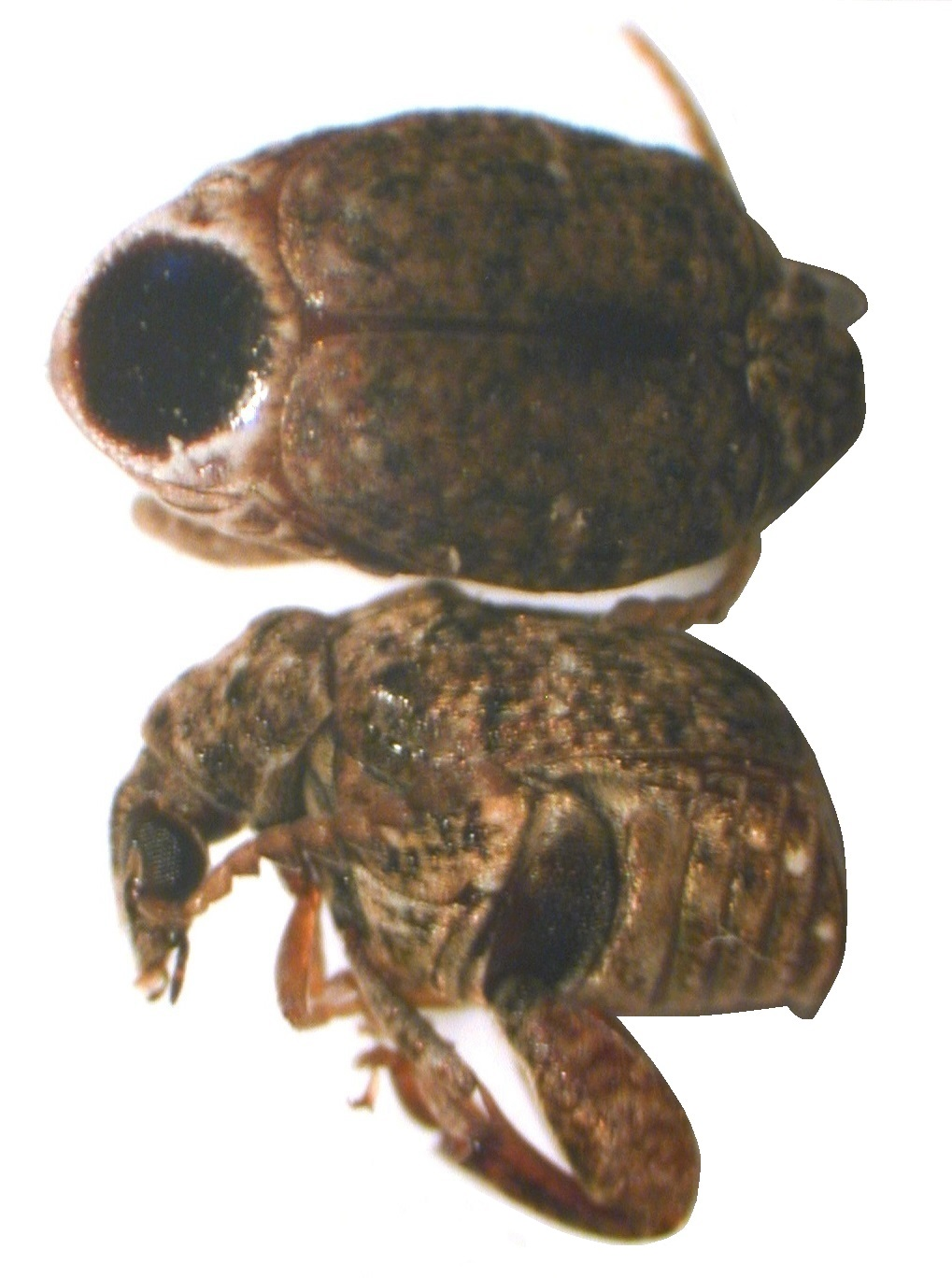
Bruchine with powerful femora used for escape from hard-shelled seed

The typical thoracic leg of an adult insect is adapted for running (cursorial), rather than for digging, leaping, swimming, predation, or other similar activities. The legs of most cockroaches are good examples. However, there are many specialized adaptations, including:

- The forelegs of mole crickets (Gryllotalpidae) and some scarab beetle (Scarabaeidae) are adapted to burrowing in earth (fossorial).
- The raptorial forelegs of mantidflies (Mantispidae), mantises (Mantodea), damsel bugs (Nabidae) and ambush bugs (Phymatinae) are adapted to seizing and holding prey in one way, while those of whirligig beetles Gyrinidae are long and adapted for grasping food or prey in quite a different way.
- The forelegs of some butterflies, such as many Nymphalidae, are reduced so greatly that only two pairs of functional walking legs remain.
- In most grasshoppers and crickets (Orthoptera), the hind legs are saltatorial; they have heavily bipinnately muscled femora and straight, long tibiae adapted to leaping and to some extent to defence by kicking. Flea beetles (Alticini) also have powerful hind femora that enable them to leap spectacularly.
- Other beetles with spectacularly muscular hind femora may not be saltatorial at all, but very clumsy; for example, particular species of bean weevils (Bruchinae) use their swollen hind legs for forcing their way out of the hard-shelled seeds of plants such as Erythrina in which they grew to adulthood.
- The legs of the Odonata, the dragonflies and damselflies, are adapted for seizing prey that the insects feed on while flying or while sitting still on a plant; they are nearly incapable of using them for walking.
- The majority of aquatic insects use their legs only for swimming (natatorial), though many species of immature insects swim by other means such as by wriggling, undulating, or expelling water in jets.

Expression of Hox genes in the body segments of different groups of arthropod, as traced by evolutionary developmental biology. The Hox genes 7, 8, and 9 correspond in these groups but are shifted (by heterochrony) by up to three segments. Segments with maxillopeds have Hox gene 7. Fossil trilobites probably had three body regions, each with a unique combination of Hox genes.

== Evolution and homology of arthropod legs ==
The embryonic body segments (somites) of different arthropods taxa have diverged from a simple body plan with many similar appendages which are serially homologous, into a variety of body plans with fewer segments equipped with specialised appendages. The homologies between these have been discovered by comparing genes in evolutionary developmental biology.

Somite (body segment)	Trilobite (Trilobitomorpha)	Spider (Chelicerata)	Centipede (Myriapoda)	Insect (Hexapoda)	Shrimp (Crustacea)
1	antennae	chelicerae (jaws and fangs)	antennae	antennae	1st antennae
2	1st legs	pedipalps	-	-	2nd antennae
3	2nd legs	1st legs	mandibles	mandibles	mandibles (jaws)
4	3rd legs	2nd legs	1st maxillae	1st maxillae	1st maxillae
5	4th legs	3rd legs	2nd maxillae	2nd maxillae	2nd maxillae
6	5th legs	4th legs	collum (no legs)	1st legs	1st legs
7	6th legs	-	1st legs	2nd legs	2nd legs
8	7th legs	-	2nd legs	3rd legs	3rd legs
9	8th legs	-	3rd legs	-	4th legs
10	9th legs	-	4th legs	-	5th legs

== See also ==
- Limb
- Tentacle
- Tube foot
