= Macrotomoxia =

Scientific classification
- Domain: Eukaryota
- Kingdom: Animalia
- Phylum: Arthropoda
- Class: Insecta
- Order: Coleoptera
- Suborder: Polyphaga
- Infraorder: Cucujiformia
- Family: Mordellidae
- Subfamily: Mordellinae
- Tribe: Mordellini
- Genus: Macrotomoxia; Píc, 1922

Type species
- Macrotomoxia castanea Píc, 1922

Synonyms
- Highehananomia Kônô, 1935

Genus of beetles

Macrotomoxia is a genus of beetles in the family Mordellidae, containing the following species:

- Macrotomoxia castanea Píc, 1922
- Macrotomoxia gardneri (Blair, 1931)
- Macrotomoxia palpalis (Kônô, 1935)
