= Phungia trotommoides =

Scientific classification
- Domain: Eukaryota
- Kingdom: Animalia
- Phylum: Arthropoda
- Class: Insecta
- Order: Coleoptera
- Suborder: Polyphaga
- Infraorder: Cucujiformia
- Family: Mordellidae
- Genus: Phungia
- Species: P. trotommoides

Binomial name
- Phungia trotommoides (Franciscolo, 1962)

Synonyms
- Dollmania trotommoides Franciscolo, 1962

Species of beetle

Phungia trotommoides is a species of beetle in the genus Phungia of the family Mordellidae. It was described in 1962.

== Subspecies ==
- Phungia trotommoides seraptiiformis Franciscolo, 1962
- Phungia trotommoides trotommoides Franciscolo, 1962
