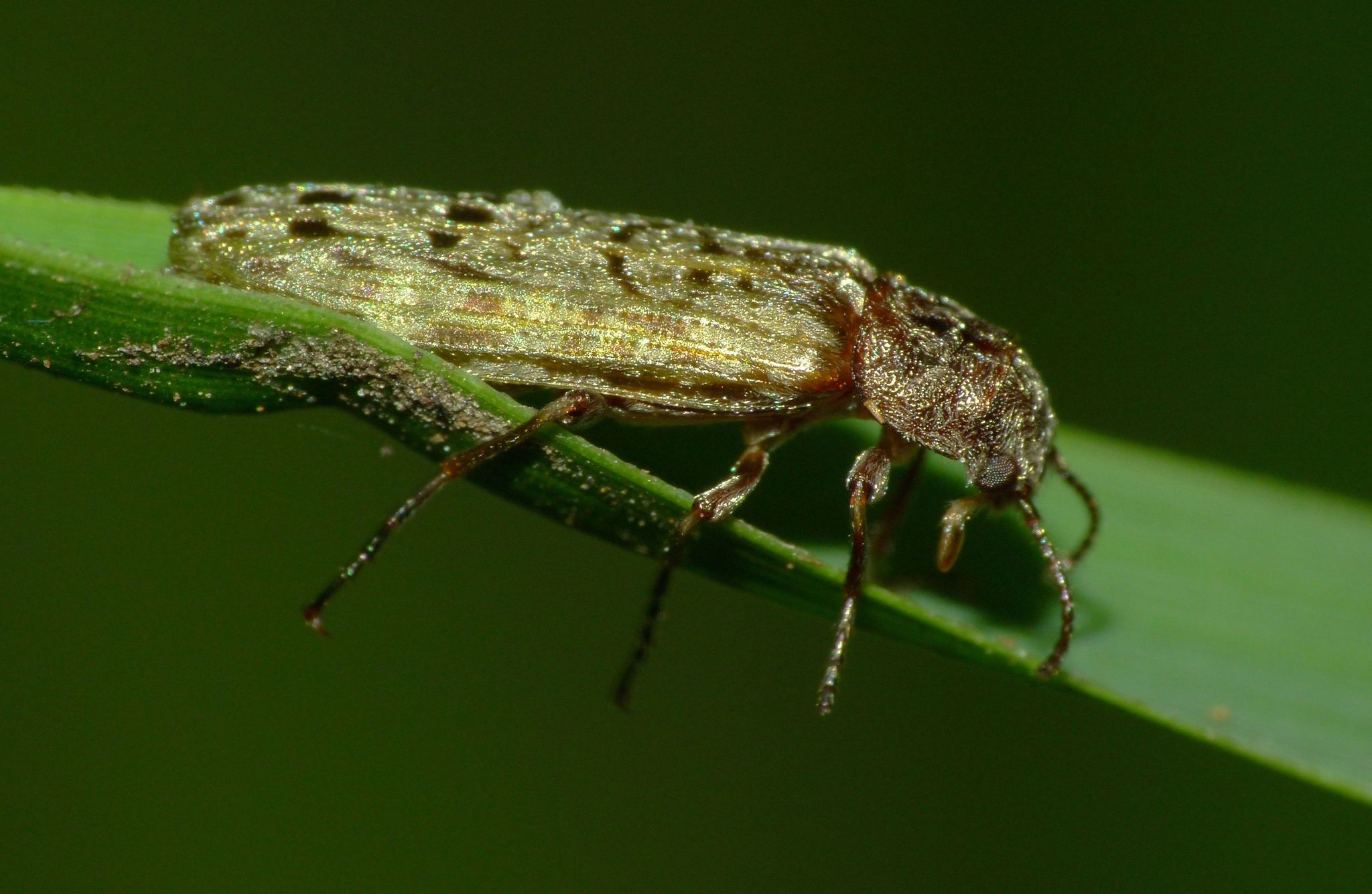
- Philpottia mollis

Scientific classification
- Kingdom: Animalia
- Phylum: Arthropoda
- Clade: Pancrustacea
- Class: Insecta
- Order: Coleoptera
- Suborder: Polyphaga
- Infraorder: Cucujiformia
- Family: Chalcodryidae
- Genus: Philpottia; Broun, 1915

= Philpottia =

Genus of beetle

Philpottia is a genus of Chalcodryidae endemic to New Zealand. There are two described species.

== Species ==
- Philpottia mollis (Broun, 1886)
- Philpottia levinotis Watt, 1974
