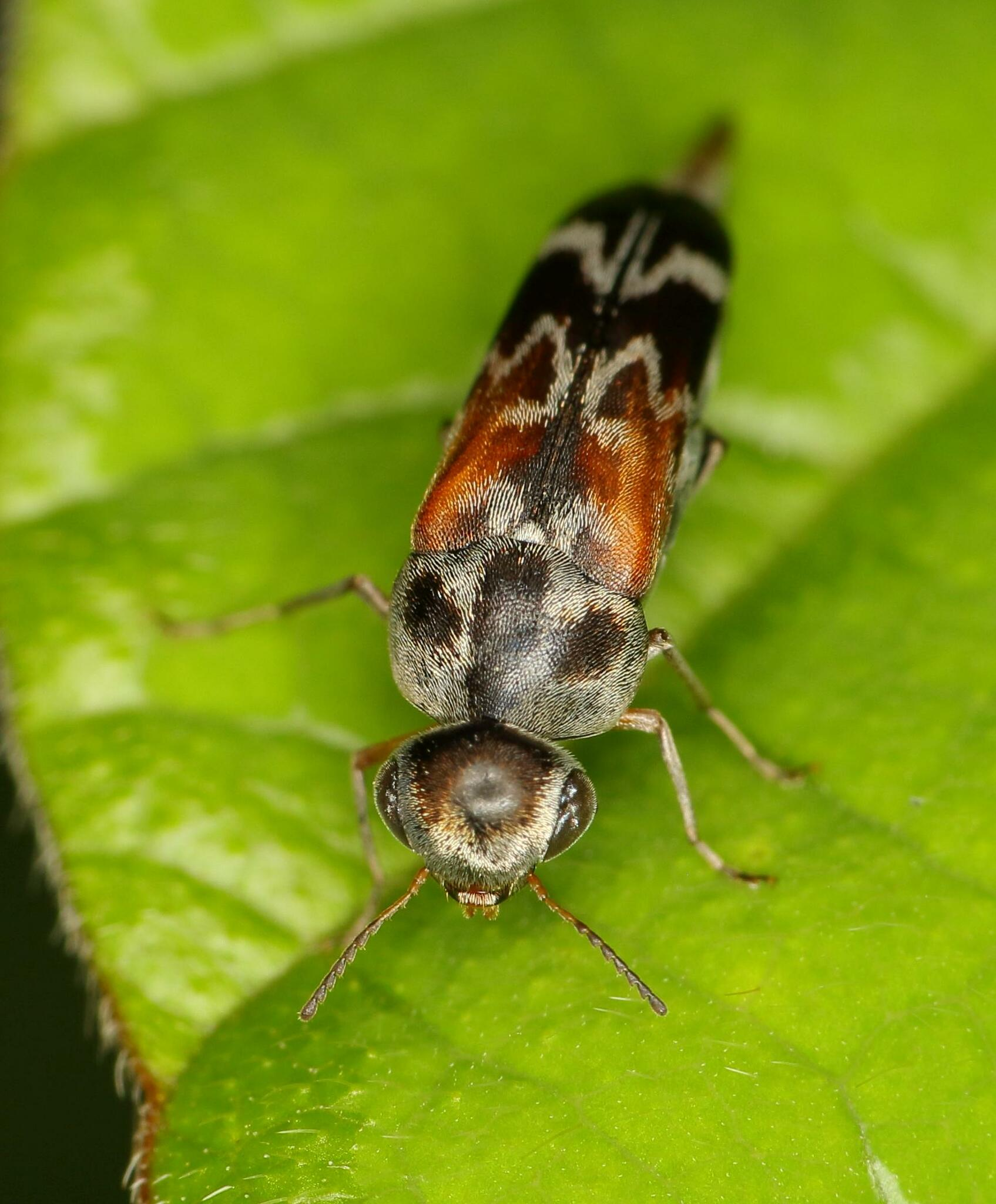
- Glipidiomorpha fahraei, South Africa

Scientific classification
- Kingdom: Animalia
- Phylum: Arthropoda
- Class: Insecta
- Order: Coleoptera
- Suborder: Polyphaga
- Infraorder: Cucujiformia
- Family: Mordellidae
- Subfamily: Mordellinae
- Tribe: Mordellini
- Genus: Glipidiomorpha; Franciscolo, 1952

= Glipidiomorpha =

Genus of beetles

Glipidiomorpha is a genus of tumbling flower beetles in the family Mordellidae.

== Species ==
The following species belong to the genus Glipidiomorpha.

- Glipidiomorpha alboscutellata (Kono, 1934)
- Glipidiomorpha astrolabii Franciscolo, 1952
- Glipidiomorpha atraterga Lu & Fan, 2000
- Glipidiomorpha burgeoni Píc, 1929
- Glipidiomorpha curticauda Ermisch, 1968
- Glipidiomorpha dorsalis Franciscolo, 1955
- Glipidiomorpha fahraei Maeklin, 1975
- Glipidiomorpha ideodorsalis Franciscolo, 1955
- Glipidiomorpha intermedia Franciscolo, 1955
- Glipidiomorpha kuatunensis Ermisch, 1968
- Glipidiomorpha leucozona Franciscolo, 1952
- Glipidiomorpha melanozosta (Fairmaire, 1906)
- Glipidiomorpha obsoleta Franciscolo, 1955
- Glipidiomorpha poggii
- Glipidiomorpha reticulata (Fairmaire, 1906)
- Glipidiomorpha rhodesiensis Franciscolo, 1955
- Glipidiomorpha riesei Franciscolo, 2001
- Glipidiomorpha rufiterga Lu & Fan, 2000
- Glipidiomorpha rufobrunneipennis Ermisch, 1968
- Glipidiomorpha septentrionalis Franciscolo, 1994
- Glipidiomorpha testaceicornis Ermisch, 1955
- Glipidiomorpha zufiterga Lu & Fan, 2000
