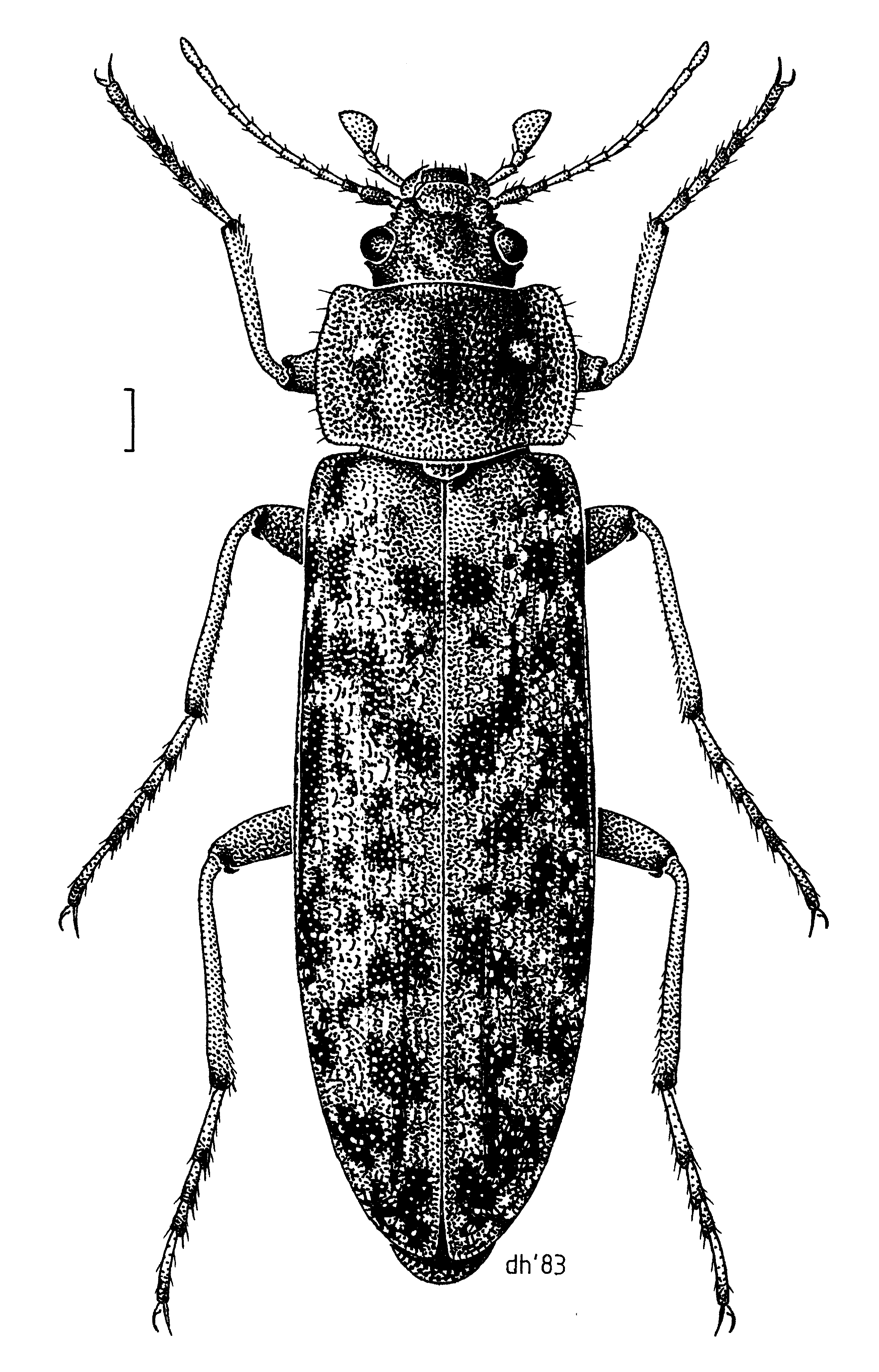
- Chalcodrya variegata illustrated by Des Helmore

Scientific classification
- Kingdom: Animalia
- Phylum: Arthropoda
- Clade: Pancrustacea
- Class: Insecta
- Order: Coleoptera
- Suborder: Polyphaga
- Infraorder: Cucujiformia
- Family: Chalcodryidae
- Genus: Chalcodrya; Redtenbacher, 1868

= Chalcodrya =

Genus of beetle

Chalcodrya is a genus of Chalcodryidae endemic to New Zealand. There are two described species.

== Species ==
- Chalcodrya hilaris Watt, 1974
- Chalcodrya variegata Redtenbacher, 1868
