= Phungia camerunensis =

Scientific classification
- Domain: Eukaryota
- Kingdom: Animalia
- Phylum: Arthropoda
- Class: Insecta
- Order: Coleoptera
- Suborder: Polyphaga
- Infraorder: Cucujiformia
- Family: Mordellidae
- Genus: Phungia
- Species: P. camerunensis

Binomial name
- Phungia camerunensis Ermisch, 1950

Synonyms
- Phungia kamerunensis Ermisch, 1952

Species of beetle

Phungia camerunensis is a species of beetle in the genus Phungia of the family Mordellidae. It was described in 1950.
