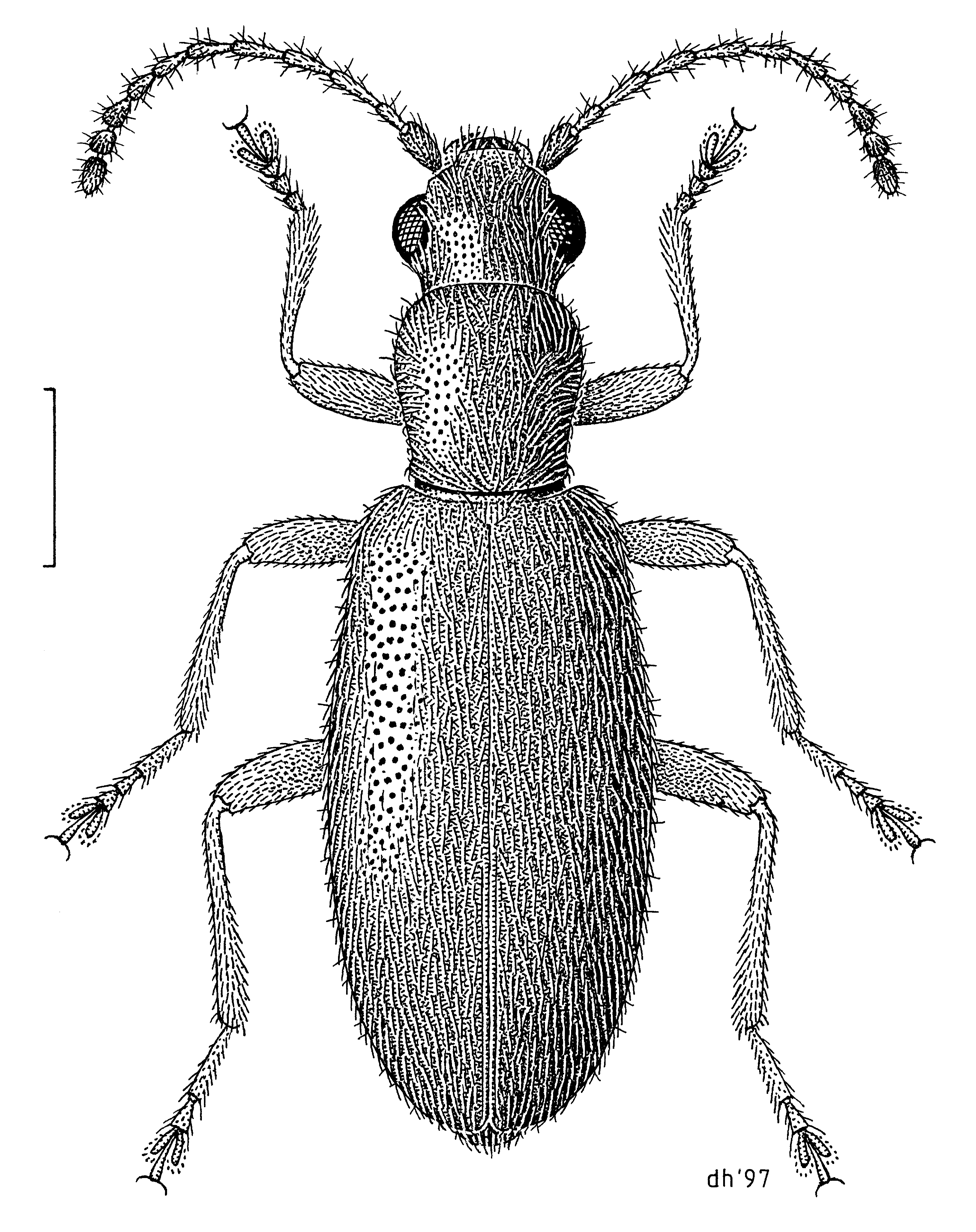
- Lagrioida brounii

Scientific classification
- Kingdom: Animalia
- Phylum: Arthropoda
- Class: Insecta
- Order: Coleoptera
- Suborder: Polyphaga
- Infraorder: Cucujiformia
- Superfamily: Tenebrionoidea
- Family: Lagrioididae; Abdullah & Abdullah, 1968
- Genus: Lagrioida; Abdullah & Abdullah, 1968

= Lagrioida =

Family of beetles

Lagrioida are a genus of beetles in the family Lagrioididae, of which it is the only genus.

== Taxonomy ==
There are six species.

- Lagrioida australis Champion 1895
- Lagrioida brouni Pascoe, 1876
- Lagrioida norfolkensis Lawrence & Ślipiński, 2023
- Lagrioida nortoni Costa, Vanin & Ide, 1995
- Lagrioida rufula Fairmaire & Germain, 1860
- Lagrioida tasmaniae Lawrence & Ślipiński, 2023
