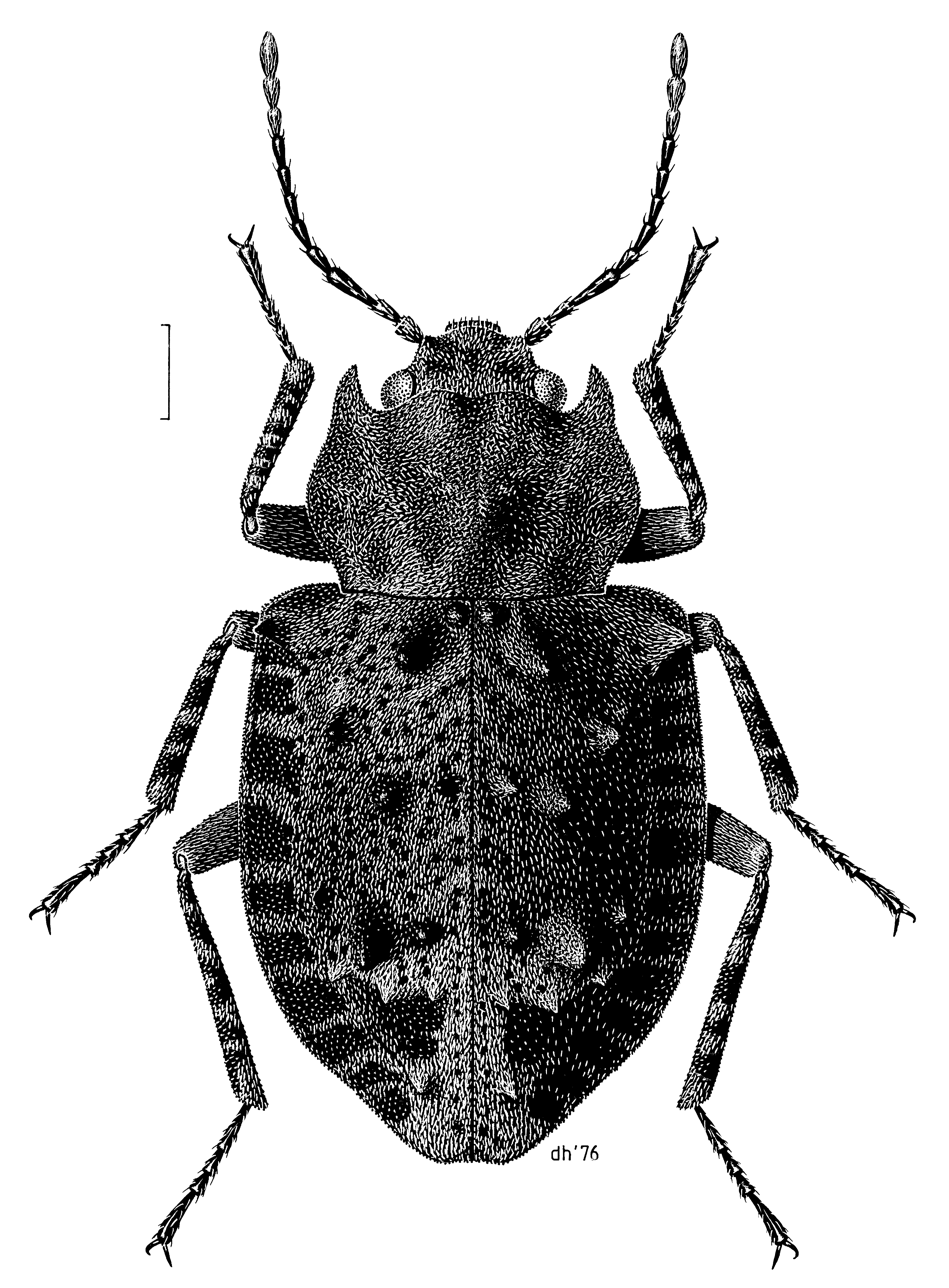
- Drawing of Syrphetodes marginatus
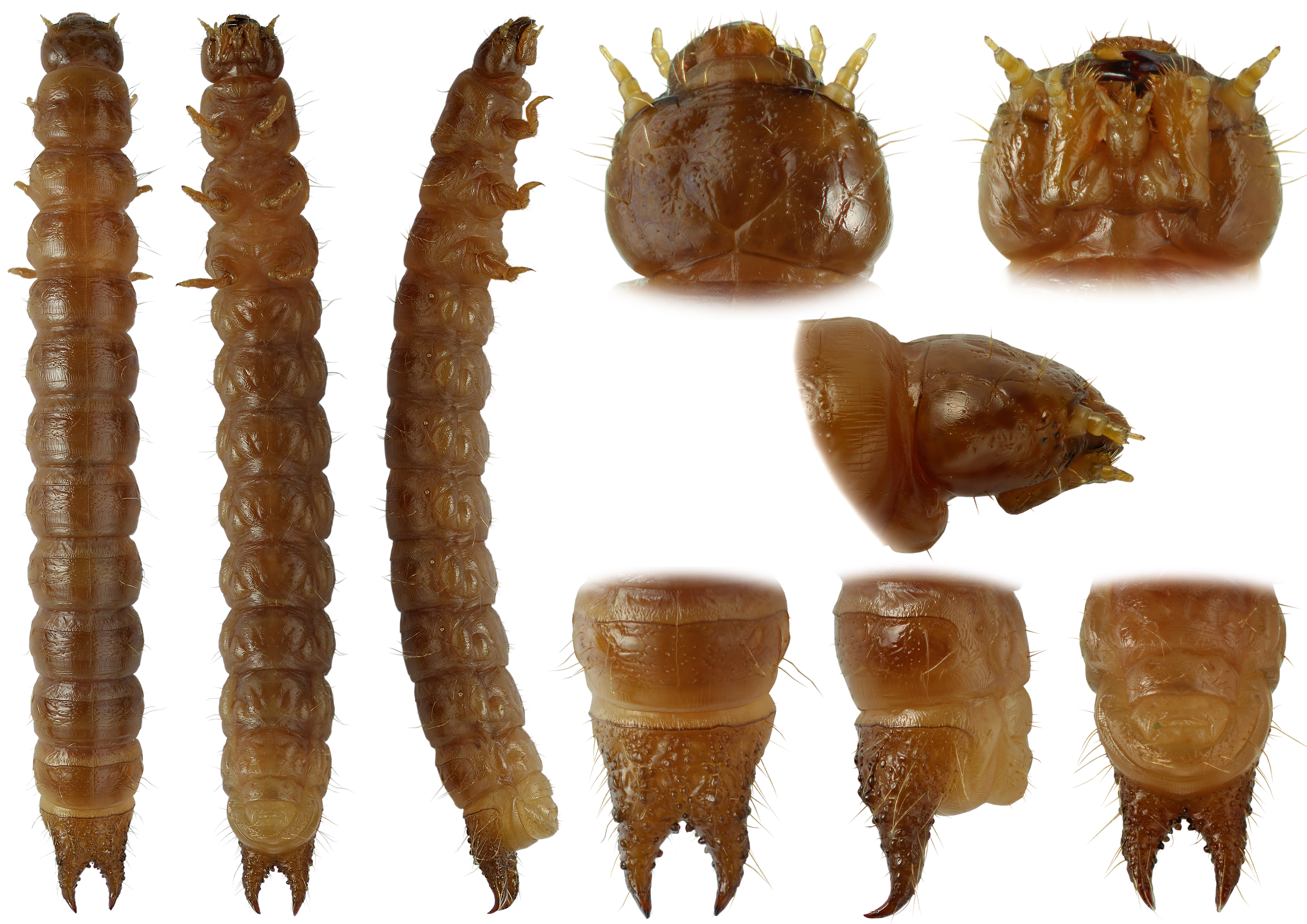
- Larva of Meryx rugosa

Scientific classification
- Kingdom: Animalia
- Phylum: Arthropoda
- Clade: Pancrustacea
- Class: Insecta
- Order: Coleoptera
- Suborder: Polyphaga
- Infraorder: Cucujiformia
- Superfamily: Tenebrionoidea
- Family: Ulodidae; Pascoe, 1869

Genera
- See text

= Ulodidae =

Family of beetles

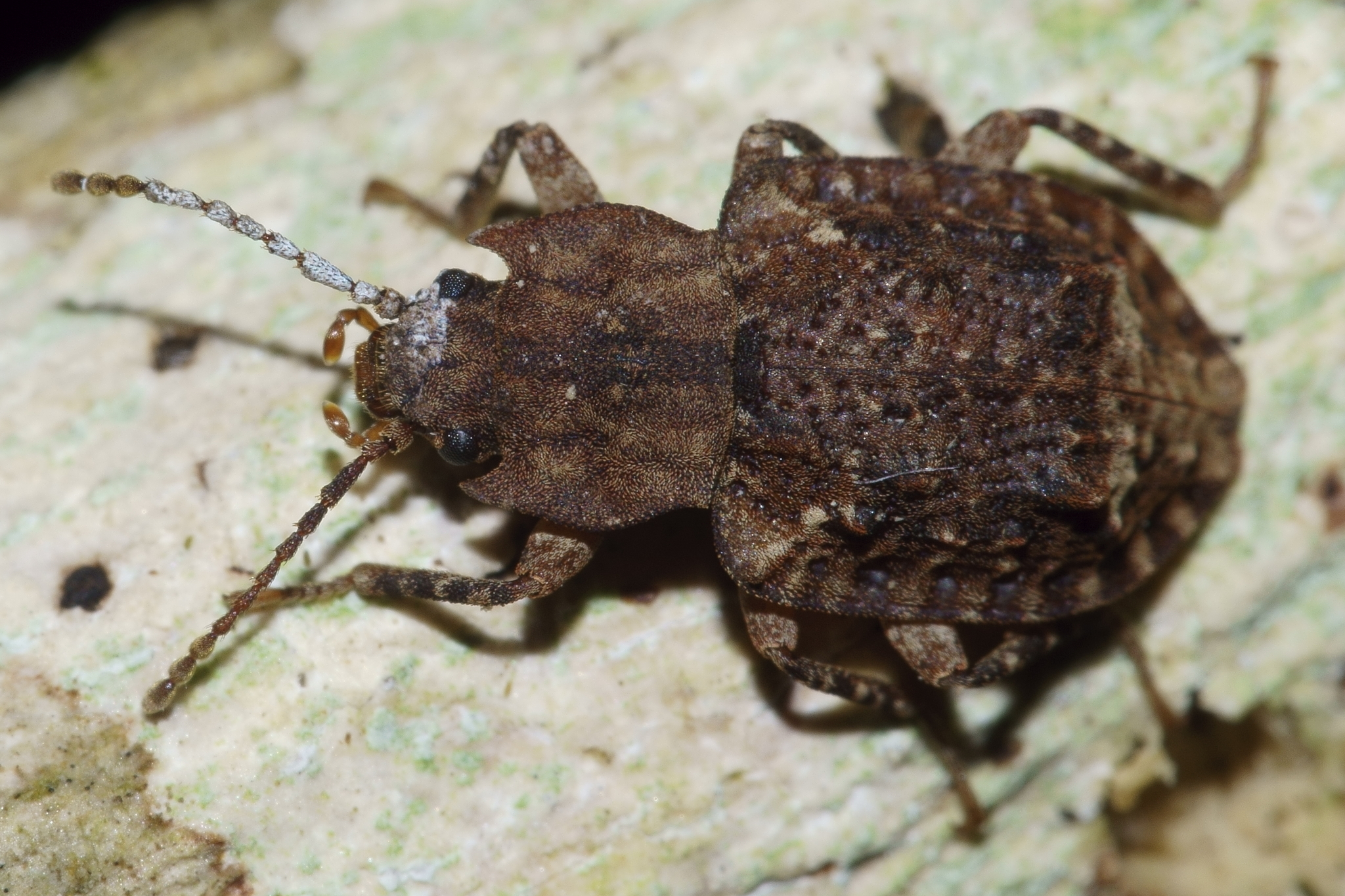
Specimen of Syrphetodes marginatus from New Zealand

The Ulodidae are a family of beetles belonging to Tenebrionoidea. They are native to the Southern Hemisphere, with species found in Australia, New Zealand, New Caledonia and Chile. Larvae and adults are generally found on dead wood or fungus associated with rotting wood, and are mycophagous. There are approximately 40 species in 16 genera.

== Taxonomy ==
- Arthopus (New Zealand)
- Brouniphylax (New Zealand)
- Dipsaconia (Australia)
- Exohadrus (New Zealand)
- Ganyme (Australia)
- Meryx (Australia)
- Notocerastes (Australia)
- Phaennis (Australia)
- Pteroderes (Chile)
- Syrphetodes (New Zealand)
- Trachyderas (Chile)
- Trachyderastes (New Caleodonia)
- Ulobostrichus (Australia)
- Ulocyphaleus (Chile)
- Ulodes (Australia)
- †Waitomophylax (New Zealand, Holocene)
