= Pterogeniidae =

Scientific classification
- Kingdom: Animalia
- Phylum: Arthropoda
- Clade: Pancrustacea
- Class: Insecta
- Order: Coleoptera
- Suborder: Polyphaga
- Infraorder: Cucujiformia
- Superfamily: Tenebrionoidea
- Family: Pterogeniidae; Crowson, 1955

Genera
- See text

Family of beetles

Pterogeniidae is a family of beetles belonging to the superfamily Tenebrionoidea. They are found in South Asia, Southeast Asia, China, New Guinea and the Solomon Islands. Adults and larvae have been found associated with the fruiting bodies of polypore fungi, although adults can also be found in litter and debris.

== Taxonomy ==
Genera in the family include:

- Histanocerus Southeast Asia, New Guinea, Solomon Islands
- Pterogenius Sri Lanka.
- Kryptogenius India and Southeast Asia
- Tychogenius Borneo
- Katagenius (from southern India)
- Laenagenius China
- Anogenius Malay Peninsula
