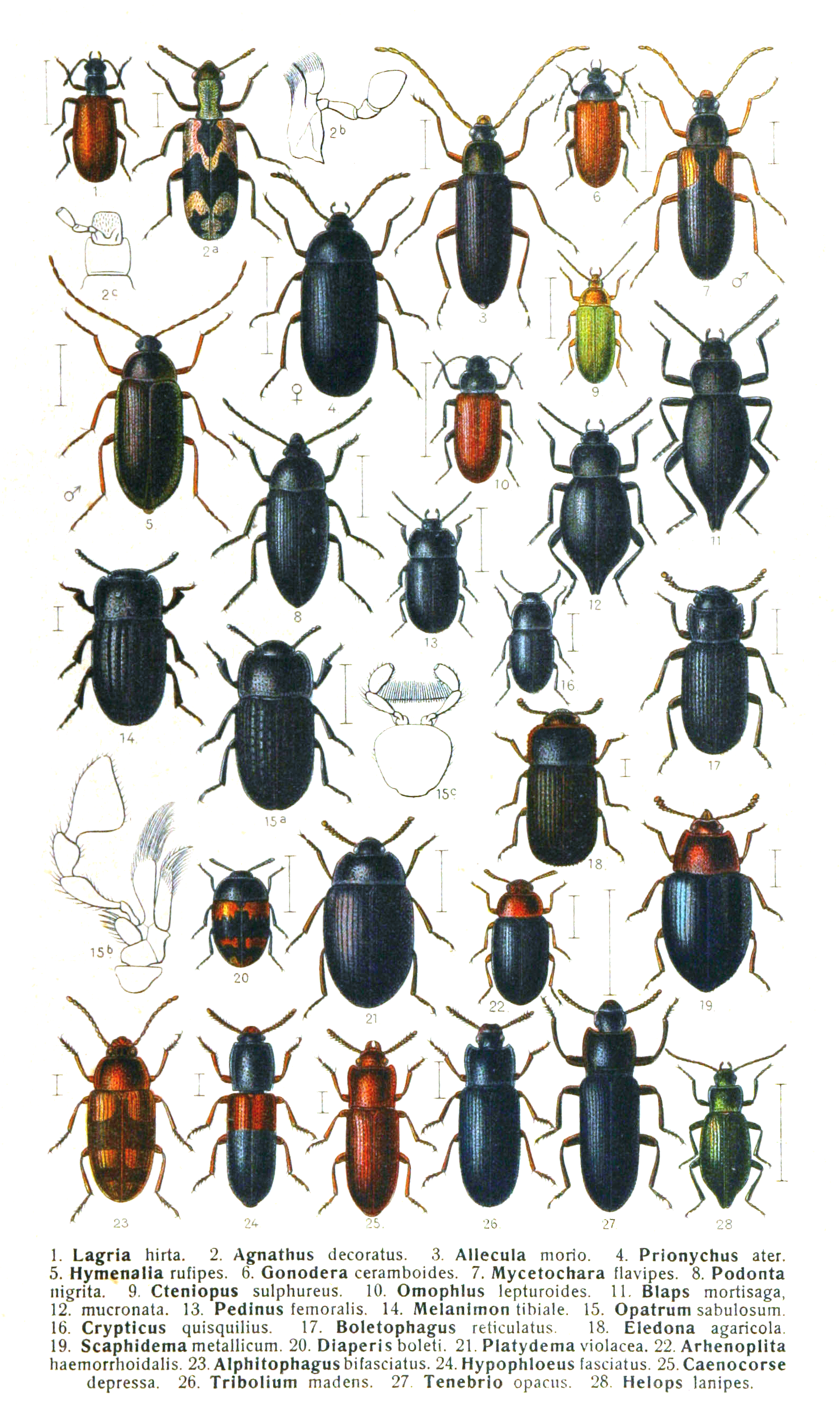
- Central European Tenebrionoidea with some anatomical details

Scientific classification
- Kingdom: Animalia
- Phylum: Arthropoda
- Class: Insecta
- Order: Coleoptera
- Suborder: Polyphaga
- Infraorder: Cucujiformia
- Superfamily: Tenebrionoidea; Latreille, 1802

Families
- See text.

= Tenebrionoidea =

Superfamily of beetles

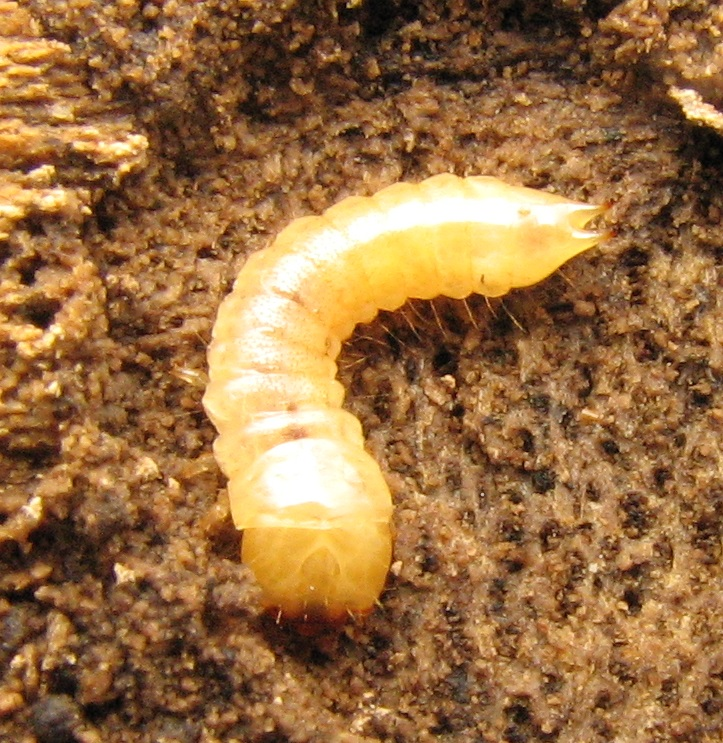
Synchroa punctata larva

The Tenebrionoidea are a very large and diverse superfamily of beetles. It generally corresponds to the Heteromera of earlier authors.

== Taxonomy ==
Tenebrionoidea contains the following families:

- Aderidae Winkler 1927 (ant-like leaf beetles)
- Anthicidae Latreille 1819 (ant-like flower beetles)
- †Apotomouridae Bao et al. 2018
- Archeocrypticidae Kaszab 1964
- Boridae C. G. Thomson 1859
- Chalcodryidae Watt 1974
- Ciidae Leach 1819 (minute tree-fungus beetles) (= Cisidae)
- Ischaliidae Blair, 1920
- Lagrioididae Abdullah & Abdullah, 1968
- Melandryidae Leach 1815 (false darkling beetles)
- Meloidae Gyllenhal 1810 (blister beetles)
- Mordellidae Latreille 1802 (tumbling flower beetles)
- Mycetophagidae Leach 1815 (hairy fungus beetles)
- Mycteridae Blanchard 1845
- Oedemeridae Latreille 1810 (false blister beetles)
- Osphyidae Mulsant, 1856
- Promecheilidae Lacordaire, 1859
- Prostomidae C. G. Thomson 1859
- Pterogeniidae Crowson 1953
- Pyrochroidae Latreille 1807 (fire-colored beetles, etc.)
- Pythidae Solier 1834
- Ripiphoridae Gemminger and Harold 1870 (wedge-shaped beetles) (= Rhipiphoridae)
- Salpingidae Leach 1815 (narrow-waisted bark beetles, etc.)
- Scraptiidae Mulsant 1856 (false flower beetles)
- Stenotrachelidae C. G. Thomson 1859 (false long-horned beetles) (= Cephaloidae)
- Synchroidae Lacordaire 1859
- Tenebrionidae Latreille 1802 (darkling beetles)
- Tetratomidae Billberg 1820
- Trictenotomidae Blanchard 1845
- Ulodidae Pascoe 1869
- Zopheridae Solier 1834 (ironclad beetles, cylindrical bark beetles, etc.)

The largest family by far is Tenebrionidae, with (as of 2014) approximately 20,000 species and almost two-thirds of the species richness of the superfamily.

== Morphology ==
The Tenebrionoidea show a range of different morphologies. However, one characteristic of most adults is having 5 tarsomeres on the fore- and midlegs, and 4 tarsomeres on the hindleg (tarsal formula 5-5-4). Occasionally, males have tarsal formula reduced to 4-4-4, 3-3-3 or 3-4-4.

Larval Tenebrionoidea can be distinguished by various features of the head: a posteriorly diverging gula with well developed gular ridges, posterior tentorial arms being shifted anteriorly, asymmetric mandibles, the M. craniocardinalis vestigial or absent, and the M. tentoriopharyngalis posterior subdivided into several bundles. The body is usually sub-parallel and slightly flattened, but other shapes have evolved to suit different needs, such as cylindrical for boring larvae, strongly flattened for larvae living under bark, and c-shaped and grub-like for larvae with specialised developmental strategies (e.g. post-triungulin larvae of Rhipiphoridae and Meloidae).

== Ecology ==
Many tenebrionoid families are fungus feeders, but there are a wide range of other feeding strategies including feeding on wood or on decaying plant material, pollen-feeding (by many Oedemeridae and Anthicidae), and acting as ectoparasitoids of other insects (Ripiphoridae). A small number of species are predators or feed on living plant tissue.

Tenebrionoidea show a particular diversity in arid environments. One adaptation shown by some (e.g. Onymacris unguicularis) is the ability to gather water from fog in order to drink.
