= Tolidomordella fenestrata =

Scientific classification
- Domain: Eukaryota
- Kingdom: Animalia
- Phylum: Arthropoda
- Class: Insecta
- Order: Coleoptera
- Suborder: Polyphaga
- Infraorder: Cucujiformia
- Family: Mordellidae
- Genus: Tolidomordella
- Species: T. fenestrata

Binomial name
- Tolidomordella fenestrata (Champion, 1891)

Synonyms
- Mordella fenestrata Champion, 1891

Species of beetle

Tolidomordella fenestrata is a species of beetle in the genus Tolidomordella of the family Mordellidae. It was described in 1891.
