= Mordellistena festiva =

Scientific classification
- Domain: Eukaryota
- Kingdom: Animalia
- Phylum: Arthropoda
- Class: Insecta
- Order: Coleoptera
- Suborder: Polyphaga
- Infraorder: Cucujiformia
- Family: Mordellidae
- Genus: Mordellistena
- Species: M. festiva

Binomial name
- Mordellistena festiva Champion, 1891

Species of beetle

Mordellistena festiva is a species of beetle in the family Mordellidae. It was described in 1891 by George Charles Champion and is endemic to Hungary.
