= Mordellistena humeronotata =

Scientific classification
- Domain: Eukaryota
- Kingdom: Animalia
- Phylum: Arthropoda
- Class: Insecta
- Order: Coleoptera
- Suborder: Polyphaga
- Infraorder: Cucujiformia
- Family: Mordellidae
- Genus: Mordellistena
- Species: M. humeronotata

Binomial name
- Mordellistena humeronotata Champion, 1922

Species of beetle

Mordellistena humeronotata is a beetle in the genus Mordellistena of the family Mordellidae. It was described in 1922 by George Charles Champion.
