= Mordellistena castaneicolor =

Scientific classification
- Kingdom: Animalia
- Phylum: Arthropoda
- Class: Insecta
- Order: Coleoptera
- Suborder: Polyphaga
- Infraorder: Cucujiformia
- Family: Mordellidae
- Genus: Mordellistena
- Species: M. castaneicolor

Binomial name
- Mordellistena castaneicolor Champion, 1891

Species of beetle

Mordellistena castaneicolor is a beetle in the genus Mordellistena of the family Mordellidae. It was described in 1891 by George Charles Champion.
