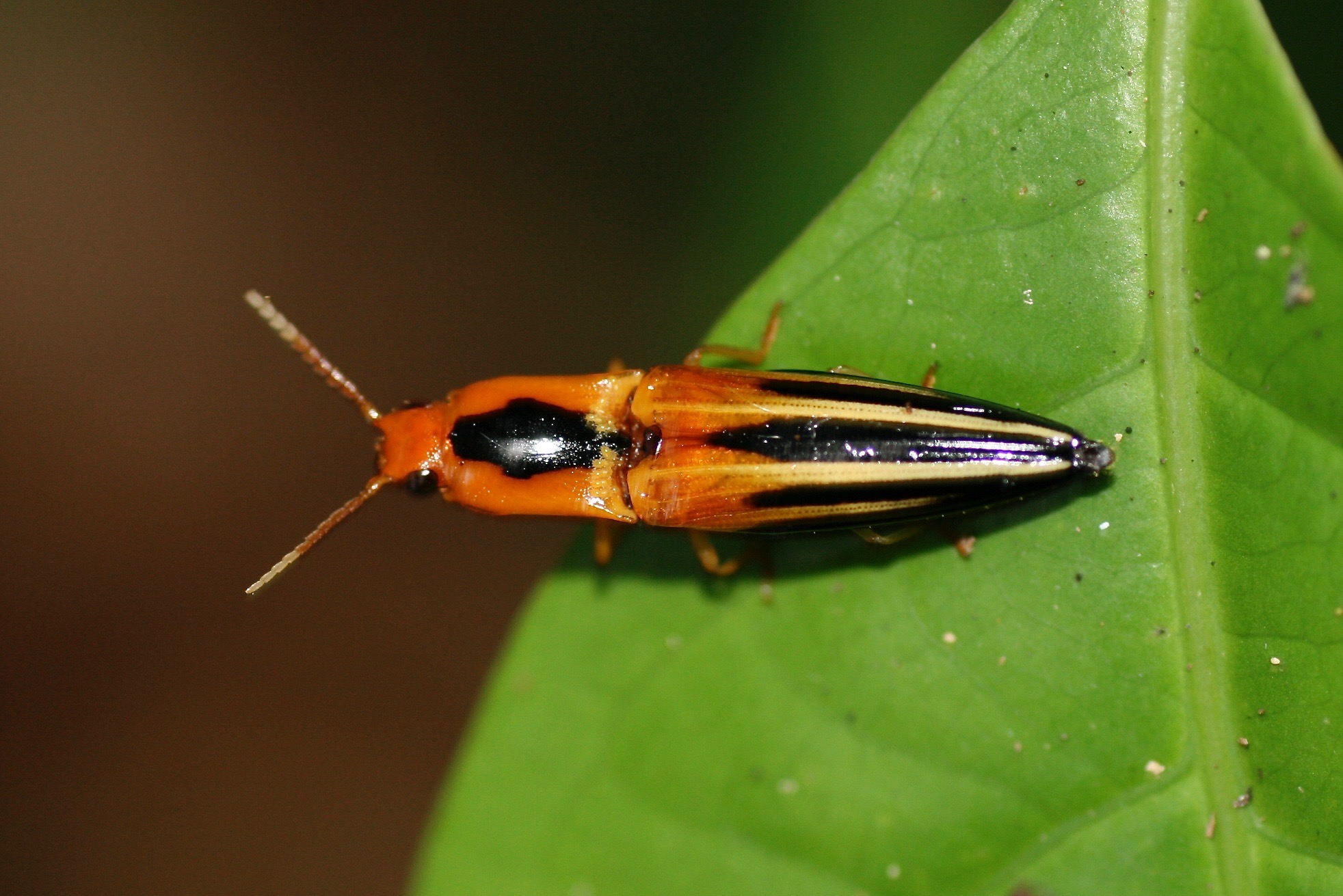
- In Peru

Scientific classification
- Kingdom: Animalia
- Phylum: Arthropoda
- Clade: Pancrustacea
- Class: Insecta
- Order: Coleoptera
- Suborder: Polyphaga
- Infraorder: Elateriformia
- Family: Elateridae
- Genus: Semiotus
- Species: S. furcatus

Binomial name
- Semiotus furcatus Fabricius, 1792

Synonyms
- Elater furcatus Fabricius, 1792; Pericalle furcatus Latreille, 1834; Pericallus furcatus Dejean, 1836; Semiotus furcatus Candèze, 1874

= Semiotus furcatus =

Species of beetle

Semiotus furcatus is a species of beetle in the family Elateridae.

== Description ==
Semiotus furcatus can reach a length of 17–25 mm (0.67–0.98 in). The basic colour of the body is reddish-orange. The pronotum has a single longitudinal median black stripes, while the elytra have three black stripes.

== Distribution ==
This Neotropical species occurs from Panama to Peru, including Bolivia and Brazil.
