= Hemicrepidius secessus =

Scientific classification
- Domain: Eukaryota
- Kingdom: Animalia
- Phylum: Arthropoda
- Class: Insecta
- Order: Coleoptera
- Suborder: Polyphaga
- Infraorder: Elateriformia
- Family: Elateridae
- Genus: Hemicrepidius
- Species: H. secessus

Binomial name
- Hemicrepidius secessus (Candèze, 1873)

Species of beetle

Hemicrepidius secessus is a species of click beetle belonging to the family Elateridae.
