= H. montanus =

H. montanus may refer to:

- Hemicrepidius montanus, beetle
- Henricus montanus, moth
- Hisonotus montanus, catfish
- Hyaenodon montanus, extinct mammal
- Hyperolius montanus, frog endemic to Kenya

== See also ==
- Montanus (disambiguation)
