= Hemicrepidius amitinus =

Scientific classification
- Domain: Eukaryota
- Kingdom: Animalia
- Phylum: Arthropoda
- Class: Insecta
- Order: Coleoptera
- Suborder: Polyphaga
- Infraorder: Elateriformia
- Family: Elateridae
- Genus: Hemicrepidius
- Species: H. amitinus

Binomial name
- Hemicrepidius amitinus (Champion, 1896)

Species of beetle

Hemicrepidius amitinus is a species of click beetle belonging to the family Elateridae. It can be found in Austria and in Germany. It was taken to Austria by German traders when they were taking supplies by train.
