= Tolidomordella sexguttata =

Scientific classification
- Kingdom: Animalia
- Phylum: Arthropoda
- Class: Insecta
- Order: Coleoptera
- Suborder: Polyphaga
- Infraorder: Cucujiformia
- Family: Mordellidae
- Subfamily: Mordellinae
- Tribe: Mordellini
- Genus: Tolidomordella
- Species: T. sexguttata

Binomial name
- Tolidomordella sexguttata (Champion, 1896)

Synonyms
- Mordella sexguttata Champion, 1896

Species of beetles

Tolidomordella sexguttata is a species of tumbling flower beetle in the family Mordellidae.
