= Mordellistena austrina =

Scientific classification
- Domain: Eukaryota
- Kingdom: Animalia
- Phylum: Arthropoda
- Class: Insecta
- Order: Coleoptera
- Suborder: Polyphaga
- Infraorder: Cucujiformia
- Family: Mordellidae
- Genus: Mordellistena
- Species: M. austrina

Binomial name
- Mordellistena austrina Champion, 1895

Species of beetle

Mordellistena austrina is a beetle in the genus Mordellistena of the family Mordellidae. It was described in 1895 by George Charles Champion.
