= Pseudotolida ephippiata =

Scientific classification
- Domain: Eukaryota
- Kingdom: Animalia
- Phylum: Arthropoda
- Class: Insecta
- Order: Coleoptera
- Suborder: Polyphaga
- Infraorder: Cucujiformia
- Family: Mordellidae
- Genus: Pseudotolida
- Species: P. ephippiata

Binomial name
- Pseudotolida ephippiata (Champion, 1891)

Synonyms
- Mordellistena ephippiata Champion, 1891

Species of beetle

Pseudotolida ephippiata is a beetle in the genus Pseudotolida of the family Mordellidae. It was described in 1891 by George Charles Champion.
