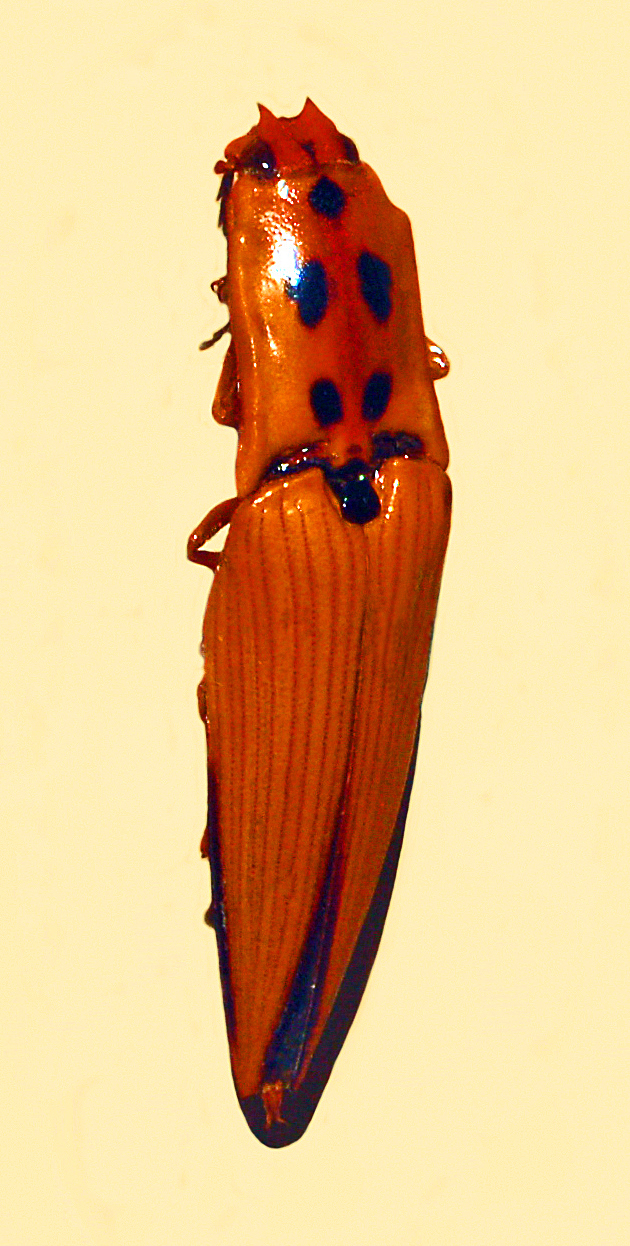
- Semiotus insignis from Panama

Scientific classification
- Domain: Eukaryota
- Kingdom: Animalia
- Phylum: Arthropoda
- Class: Insecta
- Order: Coleoptera
- Suborder: Polyphaga
- Infraorder: Elateriformia
- Family: Elateridae
- Genus: Semiotus
- Species: S. insignis

Binomial name
- Semiotus insignis Candèze, 1857

= Semiotus insignis =

Semiotus insigniss

Species of beetle

Semiotus insignis is a species of beetle belonging to the family Elateridae.

== Description ==
Semiotus insignis can reach a length of 32–44 millimetres (1.3–1.7 in). The basic colour of the body varies from fulvus to luteus. The head bears a small black spot on basal half. Pronotum has five black spots (four discal maculae and one located medially along the anterior margin). The elytra have a glabrous surface with fine striae and one spine on each apex.

== Distribution ==
This species can be found in Mexico, Guatemala, Nicaragua, Costa Rica and Panama.
