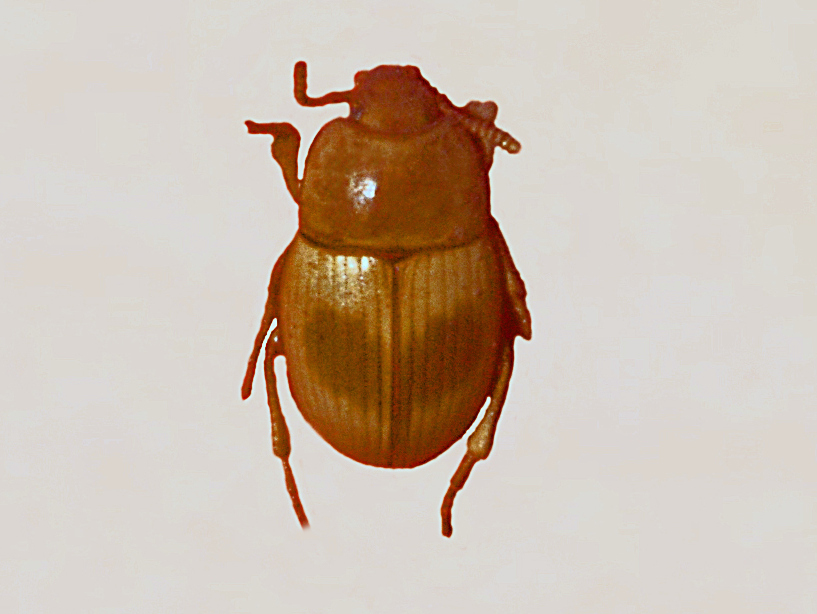
- Phaleria bimaculata

Scientific classification
- Kingdom: Animalia
- Phylum: Arthropoda
- Class: Insecta
- Order: Coleoptera
- Suborder: Polyphaga
- Infraorder: Cucujiformia
- Family: Tenebrionidae
- Tribe: Phaleriini
- Genus: Phaleria; Latreille, 1802

Synonyms
- Sepedonastes Gistel, 1856

= Phaleria (beetle) =

Genus of beetles

Phaleria is a genus of darkling beetles belonging to the family Tenebrionidae.

== Alternative classifications ==
Three previously recognized genera are now included within Phaleria: Epithaleria Lewis 1894 (two Japanese species), Phalerisida Kulzer 1959 (one South American species), and Atahualpina Español 1960 (one South American species). Epithaleria has also been used as a subgenus for three species of Phaleria, but Triplehorn (1991) concludes that there is no basis for this.

== Species ==
The following species have been placed in the genus Phaleria:

- Phaleria acuminata Küster, 1852^{g}
- Phaleria anjae Lillig, 2010
- Phaleria atlantica Fauvel, 1899^{g}
- Phaleria atriceps (Lewis, 1894)^{g} (sometimes placed in subgenus Epiphaleria)
- Phaleria bigoti Ardoin, 1969^{g}
- Phaleria bimaculata (Linnaeus, 1767)^{g}
- Phaleria cadaverina (Fabricius, 1792)
- Phaleria cayennensis Laporte de Castelnau, 1840^{g}
- Phaleria championi Triplehorn and Watrous^{t}
- Phaleria ciliata Wollaston, 1854^{g}
- Phaleria debilis LeConte^{t}
- Phaleria fulva Fleutiaux & Sallé, 1890^{g t}
- Phaleria gayi Laporte ^{t}
- Phaleria gracilipes Casey ^{t}
- Phaleria guatemalensis Champion ^{t}
- Phaleria insulana Rey, 1890^{g}
- Phaleria lata Blaisdell ^{t}
- Phaleria maculata (Kulzer), 1959 (also known as Phalerisida maculata)^{t}
- Phaleria manicata Boheman ^{t}
- Phaleria ornata Wollaston, 1864^{g}
- Phaleria pacifica Champion (sometimes placed in subgenus Epiphaleria) ^{t}
- Phaleria pallida Lewis, 1894^{g}
- Phaleria panamensis Champion (sometimes placed in subgenus Epiphaleria)^{t}
- Phaleria picipes Say^{g b t}
- Phaleria pilifera LeConte^{t}
- Phaleria prolixa Fairmaire, 1868^{g}
- Phaleria provincialis Fauvel, 1901^{g}
- Phaleria punctipes LeConte, 1878^{g t}
- Phaleria reveillerii Mulsant & Rey, 1858^{g}
- Phaleria rotundata LeConte ^{i c g b t}
- Phaleria subparallela Chevrolat (Athualpina peruviana Español 1960 is regarded as a synonym; sometimes placed in subgenus Epiphaleria) ^{t}
- Phaleria testacea Say^{g b t}
- Phaleria thinophila Watrous and Triplehorn^{t}

Data sources: i = ITIS, c = Catalogue of Life, g = GBIF, b = Bugguide.net t = Triplehorn (1991)

== Description ==
These beetles are relatively small, usually reaching a length of 4–9 millimetres (0.16–0.35 in). They have an oval body and a mostly brown-yellow coloration. According to Triplehorn (1991), they are easily recognized by their antennae, which are stout and compact, and their tibiae, which are densely covered with coarse spines and have prominent apical spurs.

== Distribution ==
Phaleria species are widespread all around the world, with the exception of Australia, the Arctic and Antarctic.

== Bibliography ==
- S. Schenkling: Erklärung der wissenschaftlichen Käfernamen aus Reitter's Fauna Germanica. K.G. Lutz' Verlag, Stuttgart 1917.
- H. Freude, K. W. Harde, G. A. Lohse: Die Käfer Mitteleuropas, Bd. 8. Spektrum Akademischer Verlag in Elsevier, München 1966.
- C. A. Triplehorn, L. E. Watrous: A Synopsis of the Genus Phaleria in the United States and Baja California (Coleoptera: Tenebrionidae). In: The Coleopterists Bulletin Vol. 33, No. 3 (Sep., 1979), pp. 275–295.
- A. Aloia, I. Colombini, u.a.: Behavioural adaptations to zonal maintenance of five species of tenebrionids living along a Tyrrhenian sandy shore. In: Marine Biology (1999) 133: 473–487.
- L. Cheng: Marine Insects. Scripps Institution of Oceanography Technical Report. Scripps Institution of Oceanography, UC San Diego, 1976.
- I. Colombini, M. A. Mateob, u.a.: On the role of Posidonia oceanica beach wrack for macroinvertebrates of a Tyrrhenian sandy shore. In: acta oecologica No. 35 (2009), 32–44.
- C. Olabarria, M. Lastra, u.a.: Succession of macrofauna on macroalgal wrack of an exposed sandy beach: Effects of patch size and site. In: Marine Environmental Research No. 63 (2007) 19–40.
- I. Colombini, A. Chaouti, u.a.: An assessment of sandy beach macroinvertebrates inhabiting the coastal fringe of the Oued Laou river catchment area (Northern Morocco). In: Du bassin versant vers la mer: Analyse multidisciplinaire pour une gestion durable. Travaux de l'Institut Scientifique, Rabat, série générale, 2008, n°5, 81–91.
- M. Lillig: A new species of the genus Phaleria Latreille, 1802 from Dhofar in Oman (Coleoptera: Tenebrionidae: Diaperinae). In: Zoology in the Middle East No. 51, 2010: 89–93.
- C. A. Triplehorn: A review of the genus Phaleria Latreille from the Western hemisphere (Coleoptera, Tenebrionidae, Phaleriinae). In: Coleopterists Bulletin, 45, 1991: 258-270.
