= Pseudotolida lutea =

Scientific classification
- Domain: Eukaryota
- Kingdom: Animalia
- Phylum: Arthropoda
- Class: Insecta
- Order: Coleoptera
- Suborder: Polyphaga
- Infraorder: Cucujiformia
- Family: Mordellidae
- Genus: Pseudotolida
- Species: P. lutea

Binomial name
- Pseudotolida lutea (Melsheimer, 1845)

Species of beetle

Pseudotolida lutea is a species of beetle in the family Mordellidae. It is found in North America.
