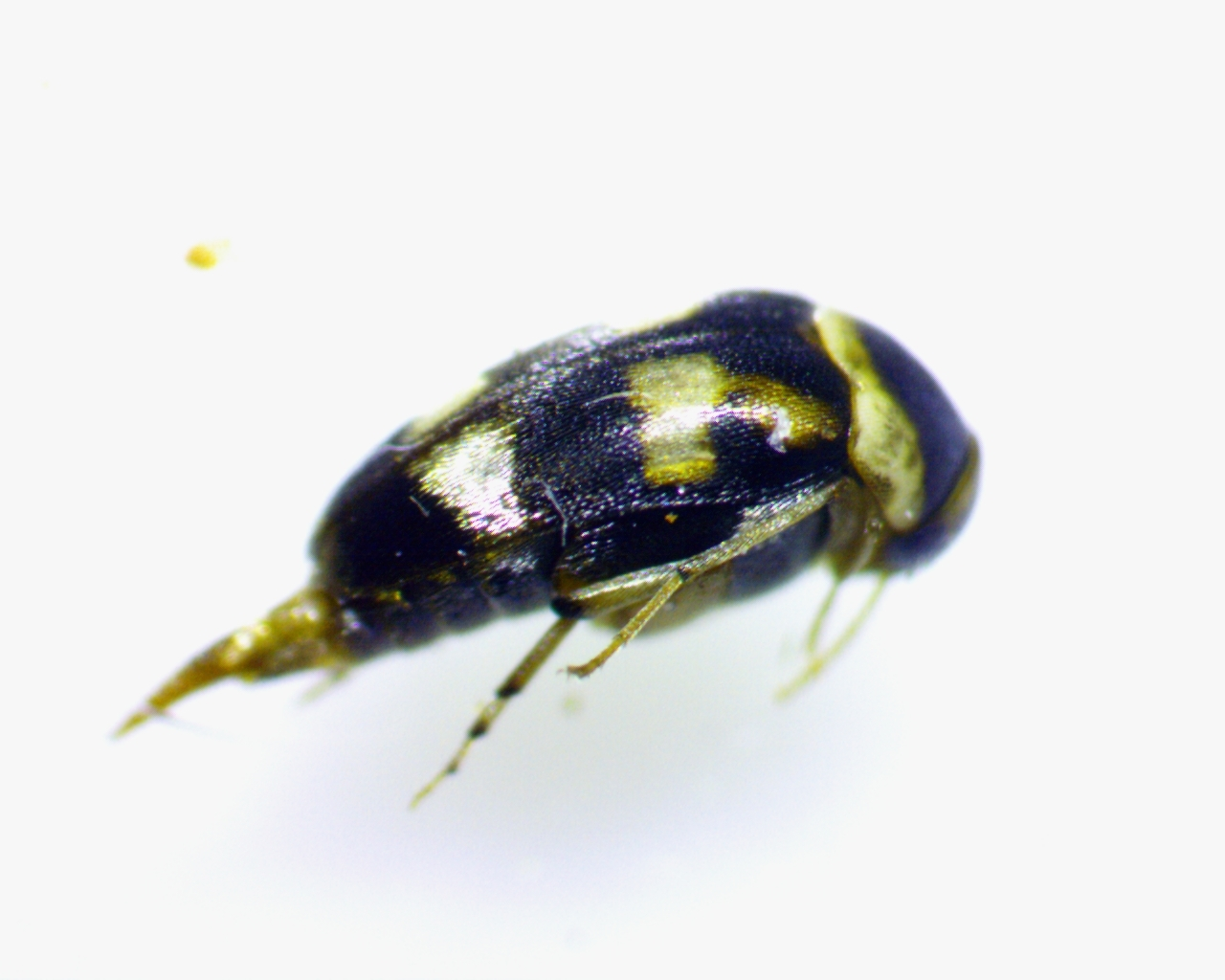
- Tolidomordella discoidea, North Carolina

Scientific classification
- Domain: Eukaryota
- Kingdom: Animalia
- Phylum: Arthropoda
- Class: Insecta
- Order: Coleoptera
- Suborder: Polyphaga
- Infraorder: Cucujiformia
- Family: Mordellidae
- Subfamily: Mordellinae
- Tribe: Mordellini
- Genus: Tolidomordella
- Species: T. discoidea

Binomial name
- Tolidomordella discoidea (Melsheimer, 1845)

Synonyms
- Tomoxia discoidea (Melsheimer, 1845); Mordella discoidea Melsheimer, 1845; Mordella flaviventris Smith

= Tolidomordella discoidea =

Species of beetles

Tolidomordella discoidea is a species of tumbling flower beetle in the family Mordellidae.

== Subspecies ==
These two subspecies belong to the species Tolidomordella discoidea:

- Tolidomordella discoidea discoidea (Melsheimer, 1845)
- Tolidomordella discoidea flaviventris (Smith, 1883)
