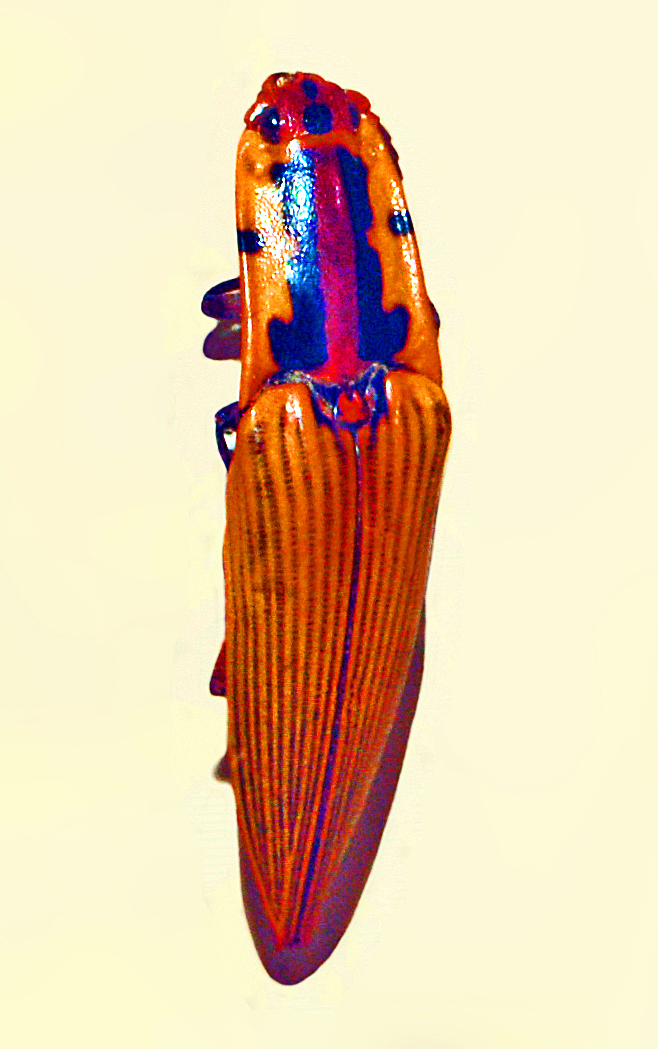
- Semiotus imperialis from Peru. Mounted specimen

Scientific classification
- Kingdom: Animalia
- Phylum: Arthropoda
- Clade: Pancrustacea
- Class: Insecta
- Order: Coleoptera
- Suborder: Polyphaga
- Infraorder: Elateriformia
- Family: Elateridae
- Genus: Semiotus
- Species: S. imperialis

Binomial name
- Semiotus imperialis Guerin, 1844

Synonyms
- Eucamptus imperialis Guerin-Meneville 1844; Semiotus imperialis, Candeze 1857; Semiotus imperialis subtilis Szombathy 1909; Semiotus imperialis schenklingi Szombathy 1909

= Semiotus imperialis =

Species of beetle

Semiotus imperialis is a species of beetle belonging to the family Elateridae from South America.

== Description ==
Semiotus imperialis can reach a length of 28–44 millimetres (1.1–1.7 in). Basic colour of the body varies from fulvus to luteus. The head shows two small black spot, respectively in the middle of the anterior and the posterior border. Pronotum has a reddish median longitudinal stripe and two black marginal maculae in addition to two irregular longitudinal streaks. The elytra have a glabrous surface with fine interstrial punctures and two spines on each apex. The orange coloration of elytra and pronotum also shows a high reflectance in the near-infrared.

== Distribution ==
This species can be found in southern Peru, Colombia and Venezuela.
