= Phaleria gayi =

Scientific classification
- Domain: Eukaryota
- Kingdom: Animalia
- Phylum: Arthropoda
- Class: Insecta
- Order: Coleoptera
- Suborder: Polyphaga
- Infraorder: Cucujiformia
- Family: Tenebrionidae
- Genus: Phaleria
- Species: P. gayi

Binomial name
- Phaleria gayi (Laporte, 1840)
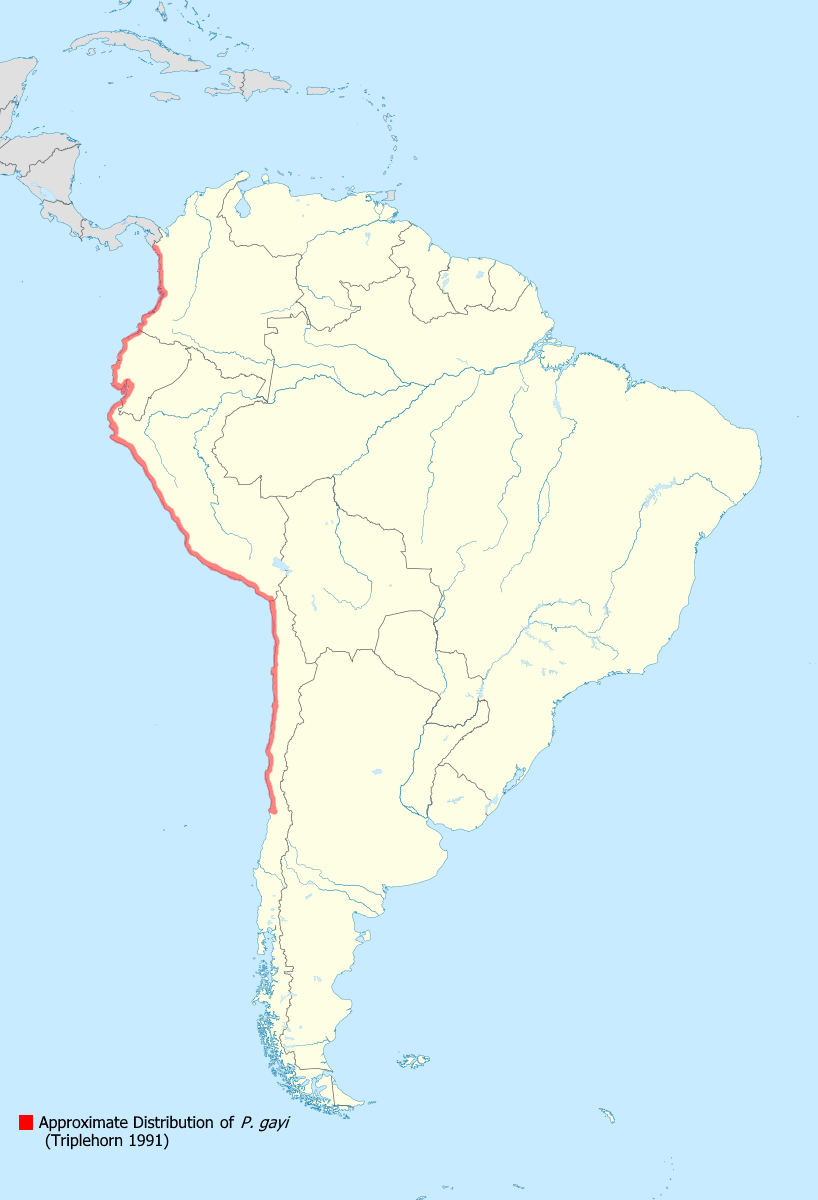

Species of beetle

Phaleria gayi is a psammophile, detrivore species of darkling beetles belonging to the family Tenebrionidae found on the Pacific coast of South America.

== Description ==
Phaleria gayi can reach a length of 4.5–7.1 mm (0.18–0.28 in). Coloration tends to vary between different specimen, ranging from a yellowish brown to a more uniform dark brown across the body. There also tends to be a darker, symmetrical fuscous marking on the elytra of the beetle, sometimes occupying a large percentage of the posterior half of the respective elytron. Like other members of genus Phaleria, Phaleria gayi occupies coastal regions, primarily living in sandy beaches.

On beaches, these beetles are commonly found burrowing underneath algae that have washed ashore. Like other members of its genus, P. gayi has been observed to exhibit detrivity.

== Distribution and habitat ==
This species has been reported to occupy the Pacific coast of South America, from Central Chile to Ecuador. P. gayi is only found on beaches with ample access to algae, or other types of vegetative detritus like fruit, and beaches that allow for organisms of the species to burrow into the sand.

In Chile, scorpions of the genus Brachistosternus feed on the larvae of P. gayi.
