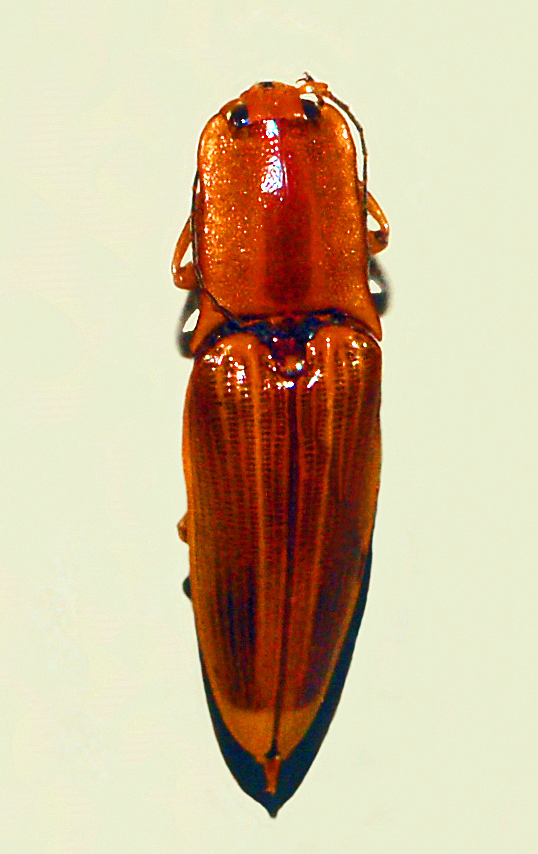

Scientific classification
- Kingdom: Animalia
- Phylum: Arthropoda
- Class: Insecta
- Order: Coleoptera
- Suborder: Polyphaga
- Infraorder: Elateriformia
- Family: Elateridae
- Genus: Semiotus
- Species: S. ligneus

Binomial name
- Semiotus ligneus (Linnaeus, 1763)

Synonyms
- Elater ligneus Linnaeus, 1763; Elater lignarius Fabricius, 1792; Elater conicus Voet, 1806; Pericalle ligneus (Linnaeus, 1763); Pericallus ligneus (Linnaeus, 1763)

= Semiotus ligneus =

Species of beetle

Semiotus ligneus is a species of click beetle from Central and South America.

It grows to a total length of 15–44 millimetres (0.6–1.7 in), and is 3.7–4.2 times as long as it is wide. The larvae are 27 mm (1.1 in) long. It closely resembles seed sheaths, which provides it with effective camouflage.

S. ligneus is the most frequently collected species in the genus Semiotus. Its closest relative is Semiotus serraticornis.
