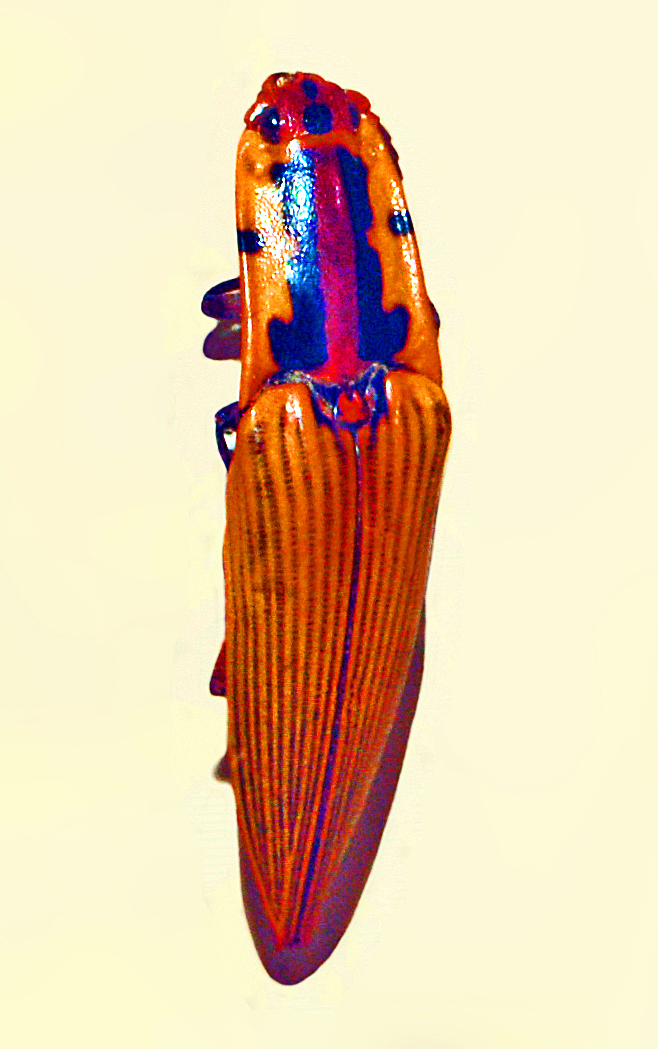
- Semiotus imperialis from Peru. Mounted specimen

Scientific classification
- Domain: Eukaryota
- Kingdom: Animalia
- Phylum: Arthropoda
- Class: Insecta
- Order: Coleoptera
- Suborder: Polyphaga
- Infraorder: Elateriformia
- Family: Elateridae
- Subfamily: Dendrometrinae
- Genus: Semiotus; Eschscholtz, 1829

= Semiotus =

Genus of beetles

Semiotus is a genus of beetle belonging to the family Elateridae. It includes about 85 large sized (14–48 mm) and colourful click beetles with bright integument. The colouration is usually yellow with longitudinal black, orange or reddish stripes. The Neotropical genus occurs from Mexico to Argentina and Chile.

The genus was described by Johann Friedrich von Eschscholtz, the zoology professor of the University of Tartu.

There is a close genus Semiotinus Pjatakowa, 1941, which initially included one species Semiotinus banghaasi Pjatakowa, 1941. S. A. Wells (2003) proposed to transfer 15 species, formerly placed in Semiotus Eschscholtz into the genus Semiotinus.

R. Golbach (1969) suggested for species of the genera Semiotus Eschsch., Semiotinus Pjatakowa and Oistus Cand. the new subfamily Serniotinae.

== List of species ==
- Semiotus acutus Candèze, 1874
- Semiotus aeneovittatus Kirsch, 1884
- Semiotus aliciae Wells, 2007
- Semiotus alternatus Schwarz, 1904
- Semiotus angulatus Drury, 1782
- Semiotus angusticollis Blanchard, 1843
- Semiotus angustus Wells, 2007
- Semiotus antennatus Schwarz, 1900
- Semiotus anthracinus Szombathy, 1909
- Semiotus approximatus Candèze, 1857
- Semiotus auripilis Candèze, 1874
- Semiotus badeni Steinheil, 1875
- Semiotus bifasciatus Schwarz, 1902
- Semiotus bispinus Candèze, 1874
- Semiotus boliviensis Candèze, 1897
- Semiotus borrei Candèze, 1878
- Semiotus brevicollis Candèze, 1857
- Semiotus buckleyi Candèze, 1874
- Semiotus candezei Kirsch, 1866
- Semiotus capucinus Candèze, 1857
- Semiotus caracasanus Rojas, 1855
- Semiotus carinicollis Kirsch, 1884
- Semiotus carus Janson, 1882
- Semiotus catei Wells, 2007
- Semiotus chassaini Wells, 2007
- Semiotus chontalenus Candèze, 1874
- Semiotus clarki Wells, 2007
- Semiotus colombianus Wells, 2007
- Semiotus conicicollis Candèze, 1857
- Semiotus convacus Aranda, 2004
- Semiotus convexicollis Blanchard, 1843
- Semiotus cristatus Candèze, 1874
- Semiotus cuspidatus (Chevrolat, 1833)
- Semiotus cuspidatus Chevrolat, 1833
- Semiotus cyrtomaris Wells, 2007
- Semiotus decoratus Candèze, 1857
- Semiotus diptychus Candèze, 1874
- Semiotus distinctus Herbst, 1806
- Semiotus dohrni Candèze, 1889
- Semiotus elegantulus Candèze, 1857
- Semiotus exsolutus Candèze, 1857
- Semiotus fascicularis Candèze, 1857
- Semiotus flavangulus Candèze, 1900
- Semiotus fleutiauxi Szombathy, 1909
- Semiotus formosus Janson, 1882
- Semiotus fryi Candèze, 1874
- Semiotus fulvicollis Blanchard, 1843
- Semiotus furcatus (Fabricius, 1792)
- Semiotus fusciformis Kirsch, 1866
- Semiotus germari Guerin, 1844
- Semiotus gibbosus Wells, 2007
- Semiotus girardi Chassain, 2002
- Semiotus glabricollis Candèze, 1857
- Semiotus hispidus Candèze, 1889
- Semiotus horvathi Szombathy, 1909
- Semiotus illigeri Guerin, 1844
- Semiotus illustris Candèze, 1857
- Semiotus imperialis Guerin, 1844
- Semiotus insignis Candèze, 1857
- Semiotus intermedius Herbst, 1806
- Semiotus jansoni Candèze, 1874
- Semiotus juvenilis Candèze, 1874
- Semiotus kathleenae Wells, 2007
- Semiotus kondratieffi Wells, 2007
- Semiotus lacrimiformis Wells, 2007
- Semiotus langei Schwarz, 1902
- Semiotus ligatus Candèze, 1889
- Semiotus ligneus (Linnaeus, 1767)
- Semiotus limatus Candèze, 1889
- Semiotus limbaticollis Candèze, 1857
- Semiotus linnei Guerin, 1844
- Semiotus luteipennis Guerin, 1838
- Semiotus macer Candèze, 1889
- Semiotus matilei Chassain, 2001
- Semiotus melanocephalus Schwarz, 1902
- Semiotus melleus Wells, 2007
- Semiotus morio Candèze, 1857
- Semiotus multifidus Candèze, 1874
- Semiotus nigriceps Candèze, 1857
- Semiotus nigricollis Candèze, 1857
- Semiotus nigrolineatus Schwarz, 1900
- Semiotus oranense Aranda, 2004
- Semiotus pallicornus Wells, 2007
- Semiotus pectitus Candèze, 1889
- Semiotus perangustus Wells, 2007
- Semiotus pilosus Wells, 2007
- Semiotus pulchellus Candèze, 1889
- Semiotus punctatostriatus Candèze, 1857
- Semiotus punctatus Candèze, 1857
- Semiotus quadricollis Kirsch, 1866
- Semiotus quadrivittis Steinheil, 1875
- Semiotus reaumuri Candèze, 1857
- Semiotus regalis Guerin, 1844
- Semiotus rileyi Wells, 2007
- Semiotus ruber Pjatakowa, 1941
- Semiotus rubricollis Wells, 2007
- Semiotus sanguinicollis Blanchard, 1843
- Semiotus sanguinolentus Candèze, 1900
- Semiotus schaumi Guerin, 1844
- Semiotus scitulus Candèze, 1864
- Semiotus seladonius Guerin-Meneville, 1844
- Semiotus singularis Kirsch, 1884
- Semiotus sommeri Candèze, 1857
- Semiotus spinosus Wells, 2007
- Semiotus splendidus Candèze, 1881
- Semiotus staudingeri Pjatakowa, 1941
- Semiotus stramineus Candèze, 1857
- Semiotus striatus Guerin, 1855
- Semiotus subvirescens Schwarz, 1904
- Semiotus superbus Kirsch, 1866
- Semiotus supplicans Kirsch, 1884
- Semiotus taeniatus Erichson, 1847
- Semiotus trilineatus Candèze, 1857
- Semiotus trinitensis Wells, 2007
- Semiotus triplehorni Wells, 2007
- Semiotus vicinus Fleutiaux, 1920
- Semiotus virescens Candèze, 1857
- Semiotus virgatus Erichson, 1847
- Semiotus woodi Wells, 2007
- Semiotus zonatus Candèze, 1874
