= Pseudotolida =

Scientific classification
- Domain: Eukaryota
- Kingdom: Animalia
- Phylum: Arthropoda
- Class: Insecta
- Order: Coleoptera
- Suborder: Polyphaga
- Infraorder: Cucujiformia
- Family: Mordellidae
- Subfamily: Mordellinae
- Tribe: Mordellistenini
- Genus: Pseudotolida; Ermisch, 1950

Genus of beetles

Pseudotolida is a genus of tumbling flower beetles in the family Mordellidae. There are more than 20 described species in Pseudotolida.

== Species ==
These 21 species belong to the genus Pseudotolida:

- Pseudotolida aequinoctialis (Champion, 1891)
- Pseudotolida arida (LeConte, 1862)
- Pseudotolida awana (Kono, 1932)
- Pseudotolida bicoloria Leblanc, 2014
- Pseudotolida boillyi Leblanc, 2014
- Pseudotolida callens (Champion, 1891)
- Pseudotolida castaneicolor (Champion, 1891)
- Pseudotolida davidi Leblanc, 2014
- Pseudotolida degallieri Leblanc, 2014
- Pseudotolida ephippiata (Champion, 1891)
- Pseudotolida isthmica (Champion, 1891)
- Pseudotolida knausi (Liljeblad, 1945)
- Pseudotolida lutea (Melsheimer, 1845)
- Pseudotolida morimotoi Nomura, 1967
- Pseudotolida poneli Leblanc, 2014
- Pseudotolida robertorum Leblanc, 2014
- Pseudotolida syphaxi Steury & Steiner, 2020
- Pseudotolida vafer (Champion, 1891)
- Pseudotolida valens (Champion, 1891)
- Pseudotolida veraepacis (Champion, 1891)
- Pseudotolida westerduijni Leblanc, 2014
