= Hemicrepidius guizhouensis =

Scientific classification
- Kingdom: Animalia
- Phylum: Arthropoda
- Class: Insecta
- Order: Coleoptera
- Suborder: Polyphaga
- Infraorder: Elateriformia
- Family: Elateridae
- Genus: Hemicrepidius
- Species: H. guizhouensis

Binomial name
- Hemicrepidius guizhouensis Kishii & Jiang, 1996

Species of beetle

Hemicrepidius guizhouensis is a species of click beetle belonging to the family Elateridae. It is endemic to China.
