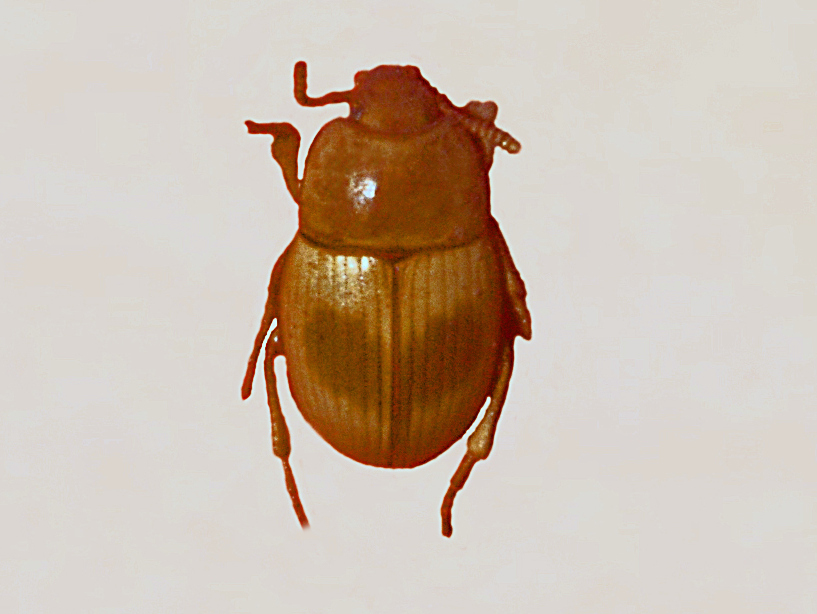
- Museum specimen

Scientific classification
- Kingdom: Animalia
- Phylum: Arthropoda
- Class: Insecta
- Order: Coleoptera
- Suborder: Polyphaga
- Infraorder: Cucujiformia
- Family: Tenebrionidae
- Genus: Phaleria
- Species: P. bimaculata

Binomial name
- Phaleria bimaculata (Linnaeus, 1767)

= Phaleria bimaculata =

Species of beetle

Phaleria bimaculata is a species of darkling beetles belonging to the family Tenebrionidae.

== Subspecies ==
- Phaleria bimaculata adriatica Rey, 1891
- Phaleria bimaculata bimaculata (Linnaeus, 1767)
- Phaleria bimaculata pontica Semenov, 1901

== Description ==
Phaleria bimaculata can reach a length of 6–7 millimetres (0.24–0.28 in). Usually head is dark brown, pronotum is brown, while elytrae are pale brown with two large dark brown spots. These small beetles show a high degree of inter-population morphological variability.

== Distribution and habitat ==
This species is present in most of Europe. These darkling beetles live in sandy beaches.
