= Pseudotolida aequinoctialis =

Scientific classification
- Kingdom: Animalia
- Phylum: Arthropoda
- Class: Insecta
- Order: Coleoptera
- Suborder: Polyphaga
- Infraorder: Cucujiformia
- Family: Mordellidae
- Genus: Pseudotolida
- Species: P. aequinoctialis

Binomial name
- Pseudotolida aequinoctialis (Champion, 1891)

Synonyms
- Mordellistena aequinoctialis Champion, 1891

Species of beetles

Pseudotolida aequinoctialis is a species of tumbling flower beetle in the family Mordellidae.
