= Hemicrepidius memnonius =

Scientific classification
- Kingdom: Animalia
- Phylum: Arthropoda
- Class: Insecta
- Order: Coleoptera
- Suborder: Polyphaga
- Infraorder: Elateriformia
- Family: Elateridae
- Genus: Hemicrepidius
- Species: H. memnonius

Binomial name
- Hemicrepidius memnonius Herbst, 1806

Species of beetle

Hemicrepidius memnonius is a species of click beetle belonging to the family Elateridae.
