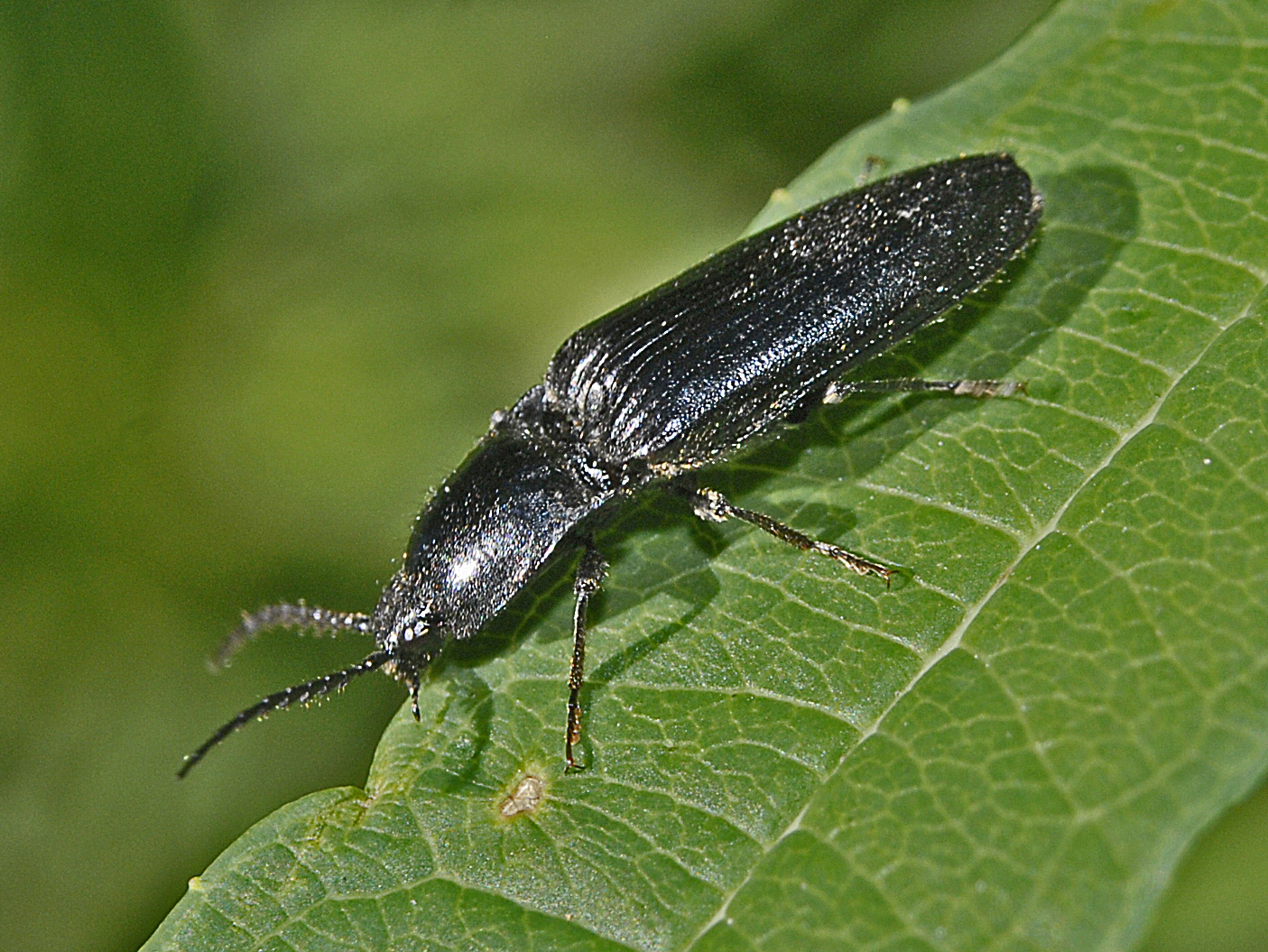
- Hemicrepidius hirtus

Scientific classification
- Domain: Eukaryota
- Kingdom: Animalia
- Phylum: Arthropoda
- Class: Insecta
- Order: Coleoptera
- Suborder: Polyphaga
- Infraorder: Elateriformia
- Family: Elateridae
- Subtribe: Denticollina
- Genus: Hemicrepidius; Germar, 1839

Synonyms
- Heterathous Reitter, 1905; Pseudathous Méquignon, 1930

= Hemicrepidius =

Genus of beetles

Hemicrepidius is a genus of click beetle belonging to the family Elateridae.

== Species ==
- Hemicrepidius acuminatus Champion, 1896
- Hemicrepidius amitinus Champion, 1896
- Hemicrepidius amoenus Philippi, 1861
- Hemicrepidius aterrimus Champion, 1896
- Hemicrepidius biformis Champion, 1896
- Hemicrepidius bilobatus (Say, 1834)
- Hemicrepidius bivittatus Champion, 1896
- Hemicrepidius brevicollis Candèze, 1863
- Hemicrepidius californicus (Becker, 1979)
- Hemicrepidius candezei Champion, 1896
- Hemicrepidius carbonarius (Stepanov, 1935)
- Hemicrepidius carbonatus (LeConte, 1860)
- Hemicrepidius chinensis Kishii & Jiang, 1996
- Hemicrepidius colchicus (Iablokoff-Khnzorian, 1962)
- Hemicrepidius consanguineus Champion, 1896
- Hemicrepidius consobrinus Champion, 1896
- Hemicrepidius consors Heyden, 1884
- Hemicrepidius coreanus Kishii in Kishii & Paik, 2002
- Hemicrepidius corvinus (Reitter, 1905)
- Hemicrepidius cotesi (Candèze, 1895)
- Hemicrepidius cruciatus Champion, 1896
- Hemicrepidius cylindricus Kishii & Jiang, 1996
- Hemicrepidius decoloratus Say, 1836
- Hemicrepidius decorus (Fleutiaux, 1918)
- Hemicrepidius desertor (Candèze, 1873)
- Hemicrepidius dilaticollis (Motschulsky, 1859)
- Hemicrepidius falli (Reitter, 1908)
- Hemicrepidius flavipennis (Cherepanov, 1957)
- Hemicrepidius flavipes Candèze, 1863
- Hemicrepidius germanus Champion, 1896
- Hemicrepidius guizhouensis Kishii & Jiang, 1996
- Hemicrepidius hemipodus (Say, 1825)
- Hemicrepidius hirtus (Herbst, 1784)
- Hemicrepidius indistinctus (LeConte, 1853)
- Hemicrepidius inornata (Lewis, 1894)
- Hemicrepidius instabilis Candèze, 1863
- Hemicrepidius jugicola (Perez Arcas, 1872)
- Hemicrepidius kibane Kishii, 1989
- Hemicrepidius koenigi (Schwarz, 1897)
- Hemicrepidius kumaso Kishii, 2001
- Hemicrepidius longicollis Candèze, 1863
- Hemicrepidius longicornis Champion, 1896
- Hemicrepidius longipennis (Candèze, 1863)
- Hemicrepidius memnonius (Herbst, 1806)
- Hemicrepidius montanus Lane, 1965
- Hemicrepidius morio (LeConte, 1853)
- Hemicrepidius niger (Linnaeus, 1758)
- Hemicrepidius nigripennis (Miwa, 1928)
- Hemicrepidius nigritulus Reitter, 1890
- Hemicrepidius nitidus Champion, 1896
- Hemicrepidius oblongus (Solsky, 1871)
- Hemicrepidius pallidipennis (Mannerheim, 1843)
- Hemicrepidius palpalis (Fall, 1907)
- Hemicrepidius parvulus Champion, 1896
- Hemicrepidius patruelis Champion, 1896
- Hemicrepidius pictipes (Chevrolat, 1843)
- Hemicrepidius pullus Reitter, 1905
- Hemicrepidius raddei (Faust, 1877)
- Hemicrepidius rufangulus (Miwa, 1928)
- Hemicrepidius ruficornis (Kirby, 1837)
- Hemicrepidius schneideri (Kiesenwetter, 1878)
- Hemicrepidius secessus (Candèze, 1873)
- Hemicrepidius simplex (LeConte, 1876)
- Hemicrepidius sinuatus (Lewis, 1894)
- Hemicrepidius soccifer (LeConte, 1876)
- Hemicrepidius subcyaneus (Motschulsky, 1866)
- Hemicrepidius subopacus Kishii & Jiang, 1996
- Hemicrepidius subpectinatus Schwarz, 1902
- Hemicrepidius tartarus (Candèze, 1860)
- Hemicrepidius terukoanus Kishii, 1961
- Hemicrepidius thomasi Germar, 1839
- Hemicrepidius tonkinensis Schwarz, 1902
- Hemicrepidius tumescens (LeConte, 1861)
- Hemicrepidius variabilis (Fleutiaux, 1918)
- Hemicrepidius vulpeculus Reitter, 1890
