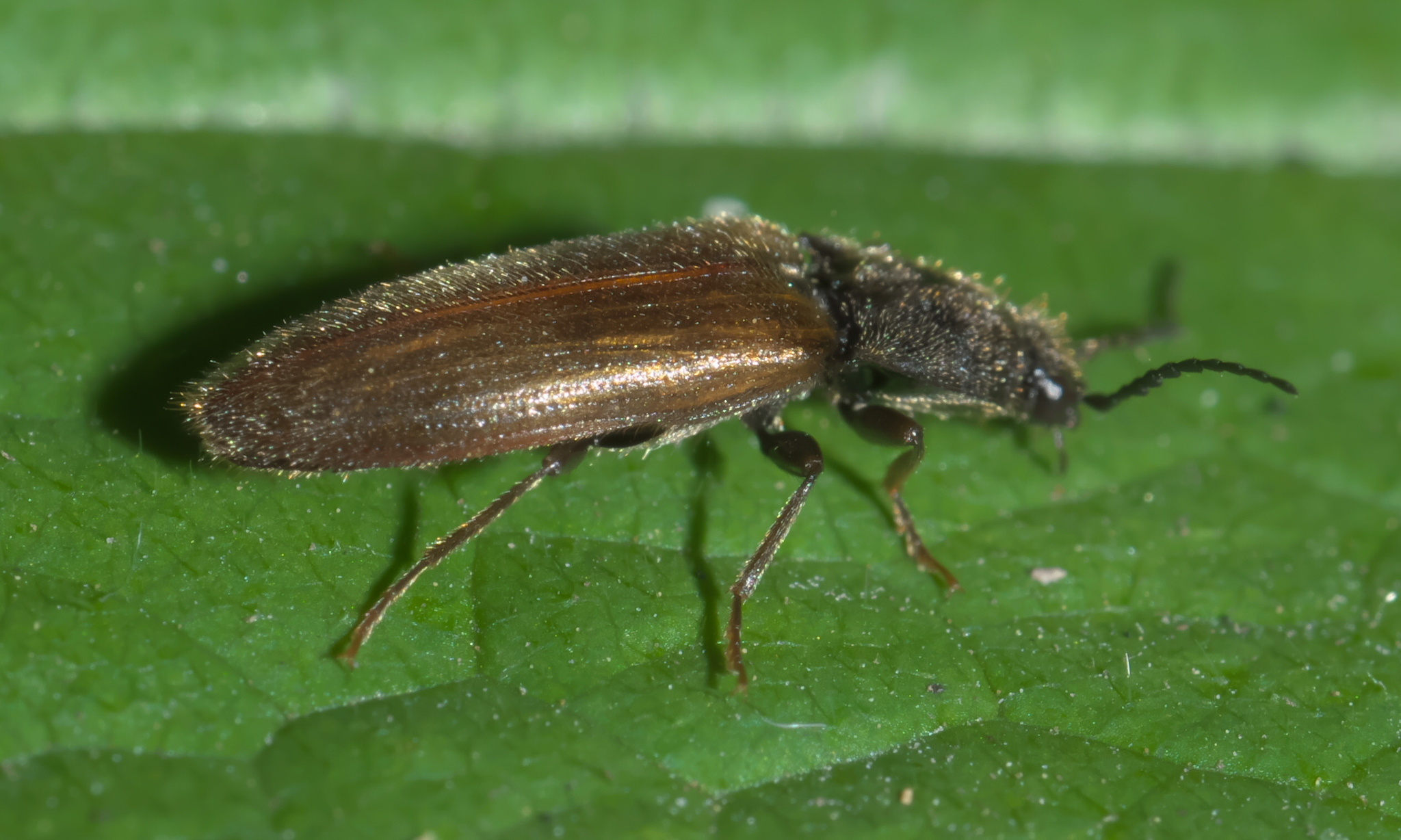
- Hemicrepidius pallidipennis, Washington

Scientific classification
- Domain: Eukaryota
- Kingdom: Animalia
- Phylum: Arthropoda
- Class: Insecta
- Order: Coleoptera
- Suborder: Polyphaga
- Infraorder: Elateriformia
- Family: Elateridae
- Subfamily: Dendrometrinae
- Tribe: Dendrometrini
- Subtribe: Denticollina
- Genus: Hemicrepidius
- Species: H. pallidipennis

Binomial name
- Hemicrepidius pallidipennis Mannerheim, 1843

= Hemicrepidius pallidipennis =

Species of beetle

Hemicrepidius pallidipennis is a species of click beetle belonging to the family Elateridae. It is found in the Pacific Northwest, in Washington, Oregon, and British Columbia.
