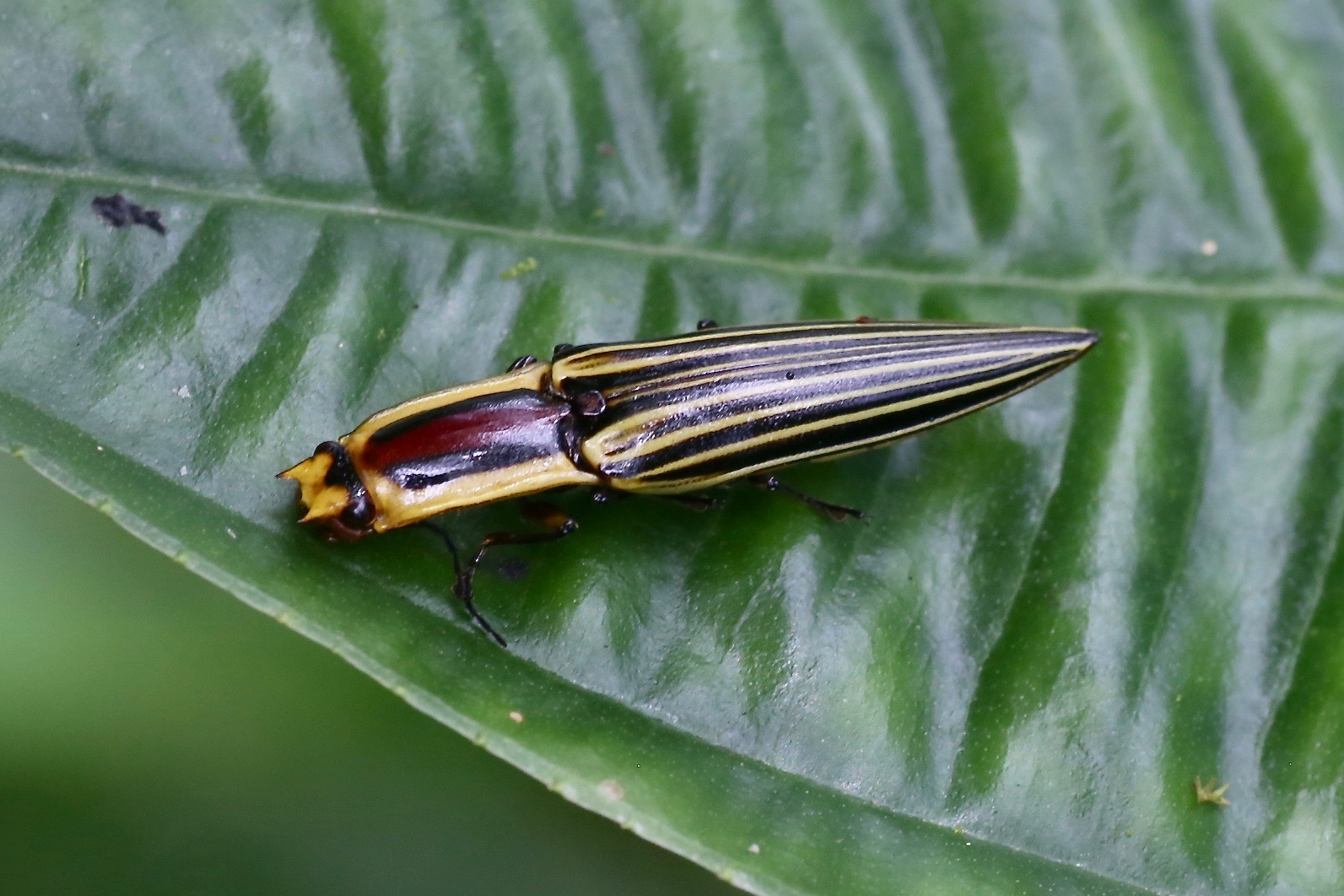

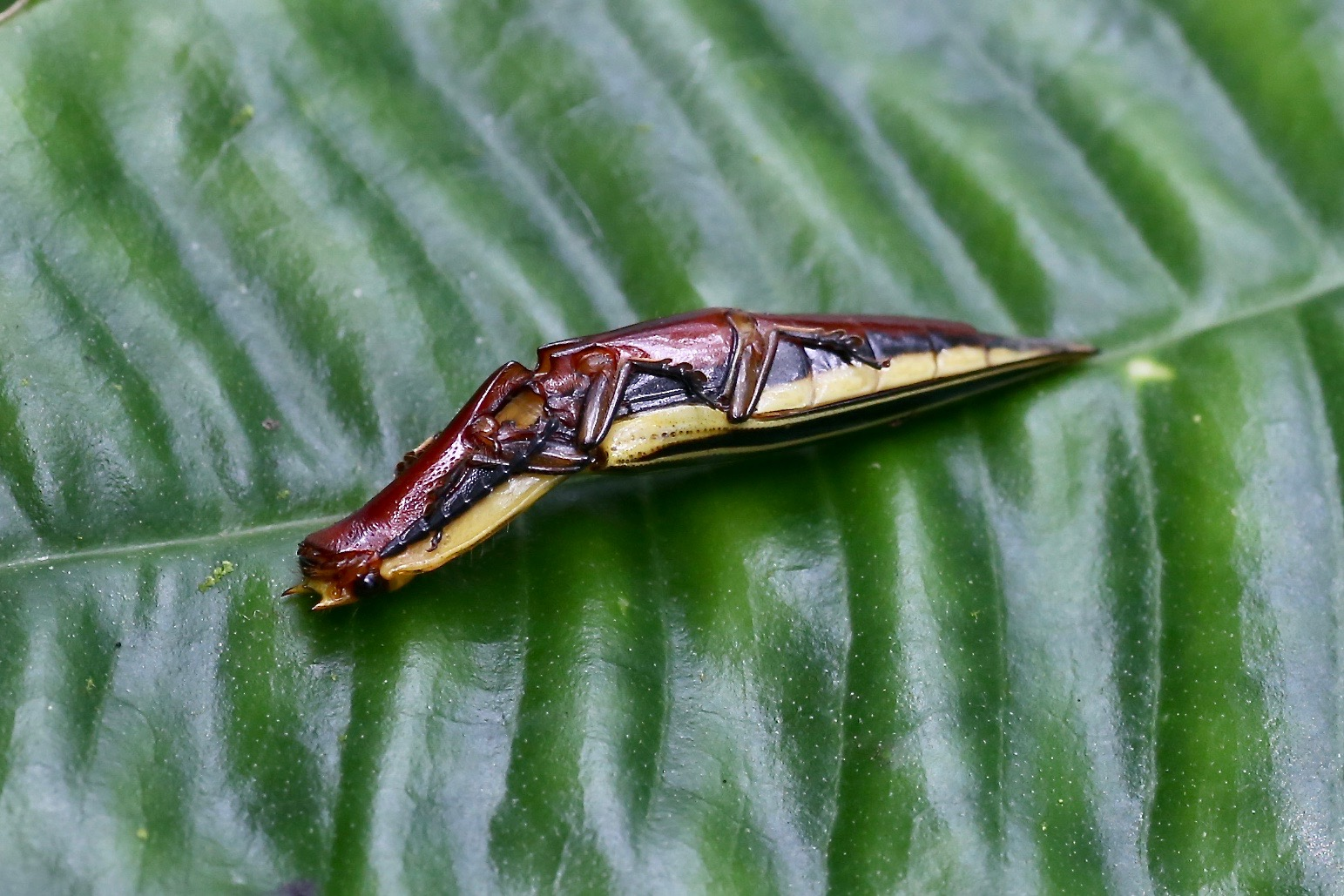
- S. superbus from Ecuador

Scientific classification
- Domain: Eukaryota
- Kingdom: Animalia
- Phylum: Arthropoda
- Class: Insecta
- Order: Coleoptera
- Suborder: Polyphaga
- Infraorder: Elateriformia
- Family: Elateridae
- Genus: Semiotus
- Species: S. superbus

Binomial name
- Semiotus superbus Kirsch, 1866

= Semiotus superbus =

Species of beetle

Semiotus superbus is a species of beetle belonging to the family Elateridae.

== Description ==
Semiotus superbus can reach a length of 19–26 millimetres (0.75–1.02 in). Basic colour of the body is peach-yellow to ochreous yellow. Pronotum with broad black stripe extending from base to apex or with sanguineus stripe separating two black vittae. Elytra have 5 (including sutural vitta) black vittae.

== Distribution ==
This Andean species occurs from Costa Rica to Bolivia.
