= Pseudotolida morimotoi =

Scientific classification
- Domain: Eukaryota
- Kingdom: Animalia
- Phylum: Arthropoda
- Class: Insecta
- Order: Coleoptera
- Suborder: Polyphaga
- Infraorder: Cucujiformia
- Family: Mordellidae
- Genus: Pseudotolida
- Species: P. morimotoi

Binomial name
- Pseudotolida morimotoi Nomura, 1967

Species of beetle

Pseudotolida morimotoi is a beetle in the genus Pseudotolida of the family Mordellidae. It was described in 1967 by Nomura.
