= Phaleriini =

Scientific classification
- Domain: Eukaryota
- Kingdom: Animalia
- Phylum: Arthropoda
- Class: Insecta
- Order: Coleoptera
- Suborder: Polyphaga
- Infraorder: Cucujiformia
- Family: Tenebrionidae
- Subfamily: Diaperinae
- Tribe: Phaleriini

Tribe of beetles

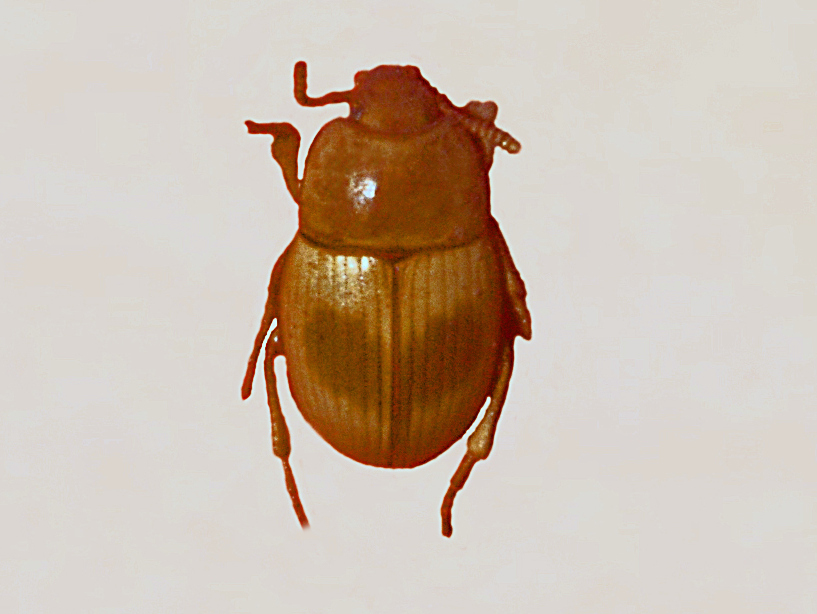

Phaleriini is a tribe of darkling beetles in the family Tenebrionidae. There are at least two genera and about six described species in Phaleriini.

== Genera ==
These two genera belong to the tribe Phaleriini:

- Phaleria Latrielle, 1802^{i c g b}
- Phaleromela Reitter, 1916^{g b}

Data sources: i = ITIS, c = Catalogue of Life, g = GBIF, b = Bugguide.net
