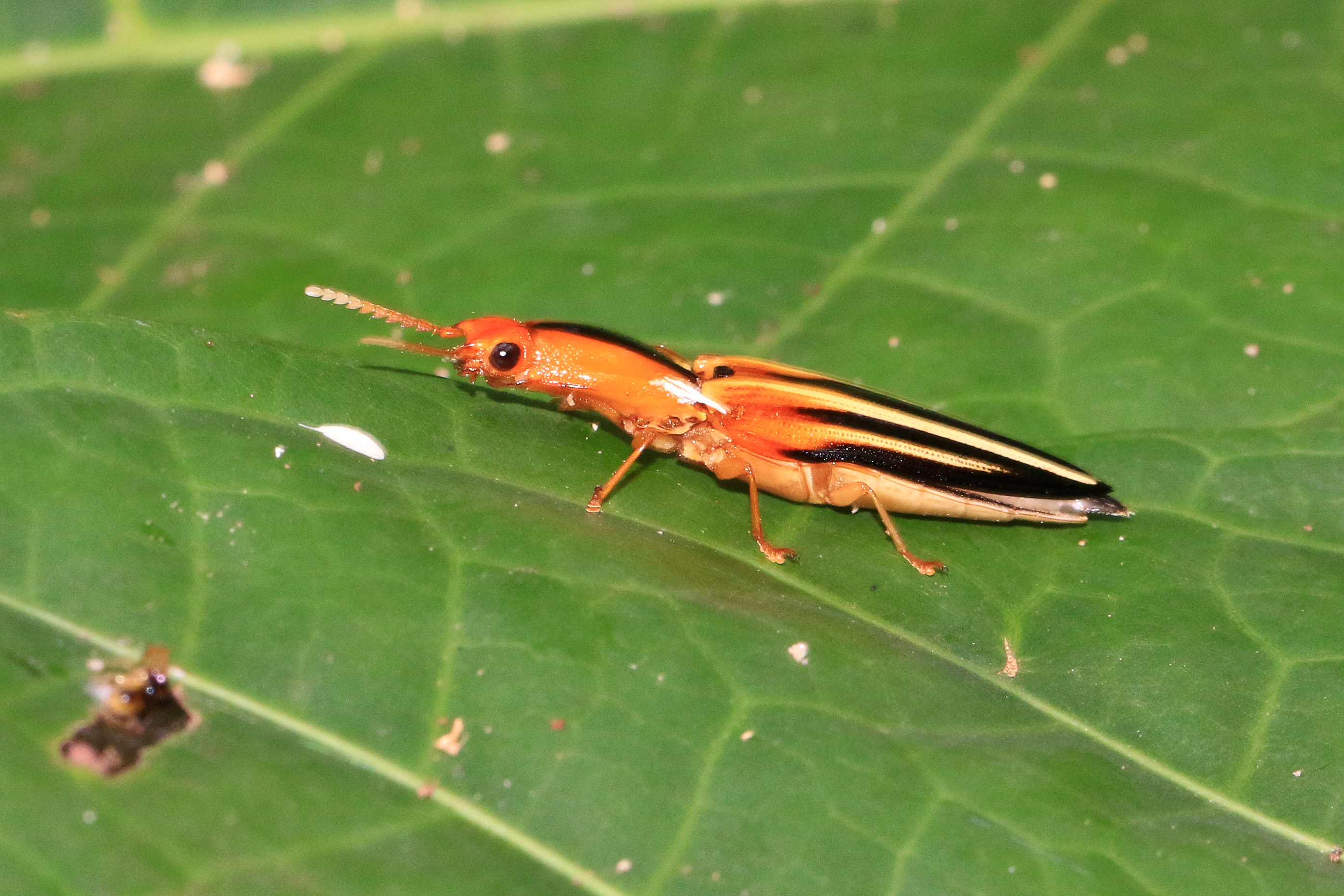
- S. distinctus from Brazil

Scientific classification
- Kingdom: Animalia
- Phylum: Arthropoda
- Class: Insecta
- Order: Coleoptera
- Suborder: Polyphaga
- Infraorder: Elateriformia
- Family: Elateridae
- Genus: Semiotus
- Species: S. distinctus

Binomial name
- Semiotus distinctus Herbst, 1806

Synonyms
- Semiotus serraticornis (Drury); Elater serraticornis Drury 1782; Elater inermis Kirby 1818; Pericalle inermis, Latreille 1834; Pericallus acuminatus Dejean 1836; Pericallus aestimatus Dejean 1836; Semiotus distinctus, Germar 1839

= Semiotus distinctus =

Species of beetle

Semiotus distinctus is a species of beetle belonging to the family Elateridae from South America (Argentina, Brazil, Paraguay).

== Description ==
Semiotus distinctus can reach a length of 28–48 millimetres (1.1–1.9 in). Basic colour of the body varies from reddish-yellow to ferrugineous. Pronotum shows a single longitudinal median dark streak and deep scattered punctures, while elytra have two stripes and poorly impressed striae.

== Distribution ==
This species can be found in southern Brazil, Paraguay and Argentina.
