= Phaleria rotundata =

Scientific classification
- Kingdom: Animalia
- Phylum: Arthropoda
- Class: Insecta
- Order: Coleoptera
- Suborder: Polyphaga
- Infraorder: Cucujiformia
- Family: Tenebrionidae
- Genus: Phaleria
- Species: P. rotundata

Binomial name
- Phaleria rotundata LeConte, 1851

Species of beetle

Phaleria rotundata is a species of darkling beetle in the family Tenebrionidae.
