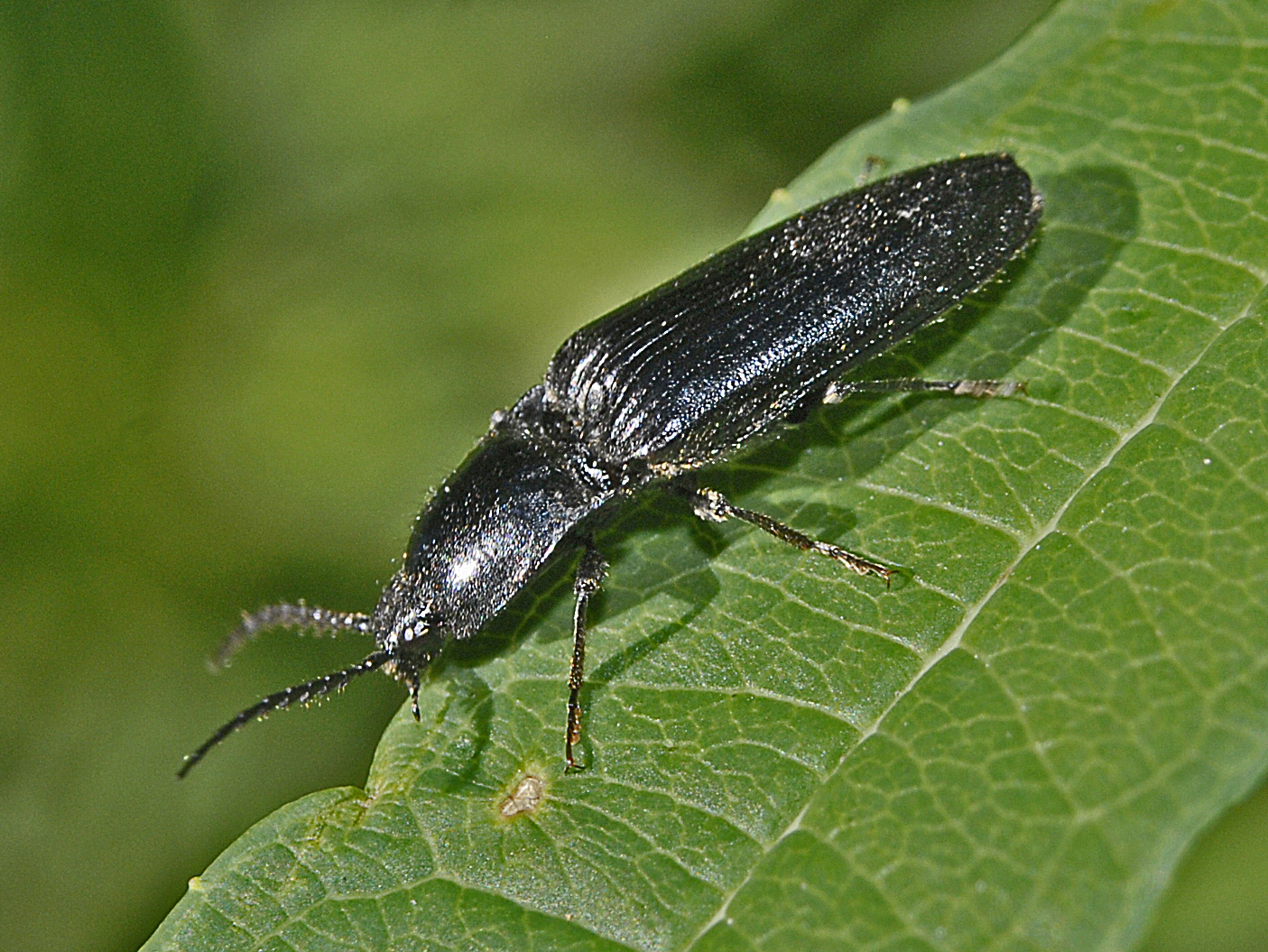

Scientific classification
- Kingdom: Animalia
- Phylum: Arthropoda
- Class: Insecta
- Order: Coleoptera
- Suborder: Polyphaga
- Infraorder: Elateriformia
- Family: Elateridae
- Genus: Hemicrepidius
- Species: H. hirtus

Binomial name
- Hemicrepidius hirtus (Herbst, 1784)

Synonyms
- Athous hirtus (Herbst); Athous porrectus Thomson; Athous rambouseki Roubal, 1925; Elater hirtus Herbst, 1784; Pseudathous hirtus (Herbst) Méquignon, 1930

= Hemicrepidius hirtus =

Species of beetle

Hemicrepidius hirtus is a species of click beetle belonging to the family Elateridae.

== Description ==
Hemicrepidius hirtus can reach a length of 13–17 millimetres (0.51–0.67 in). The body is uniformly metallic black with a slight silvery pubescence (covering of down). The antennae are quite long and along the elytra there are evident ridges. The sides of the pronotum are rounded. The legs are black. Adults can be found from May to mid-August. The larvae develop in decaying wood.

== Distribution ==
This species is widespread in Europe, Asia Minor and Iran.

== Habitat ==
This beetle prefers lowlands and mountains at an elevation up to 1,500 metres (4,900 ft) above sea level.
