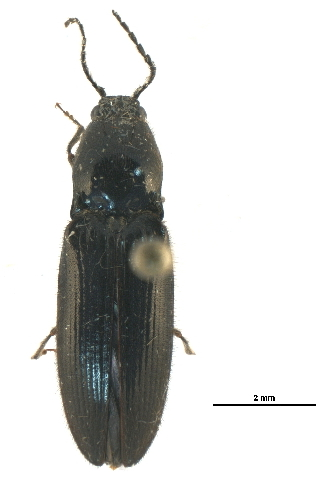

Scientific classification
- Kingdom: Animalia
- Phylum: Arthropoda
- Class: Insecta
- Order: Coleoptera
- Suborder: Polyphaga
- Infraorder: Elateriformia
- Family: Elateridae
- Genus: Hemicrepidius
- Species: H. oblongus

Binomial name
- Hemicrepidius oblongus Solsky, 1871

= Hemicrepidius oblongus =

Species of beetle

Hemicrepidius oblongus is a species of click beetle belonging to the family Elateridae.
