= Pseudotolida arida =

Scientific classification
- Kingdom: Animalia
- Phylum: Arthropoda
- Class: Insecta
- Order: Coleoptera
- Suborder: Polyphaga
- Infraorder: Cucujiformia
- Family: Mordellidae
- Subfamily: Mordellinae
- Tribe: Mordellistenini
- Genus: Pseudotolida
- Species: P. arida

Binomial name
- Pseudotolida arida (LeConte, 1862)

Synonyms
- Mordellistena arida LeConte, 1862

Species of beetles

Pseudotolida arida is a species of tumbling flower beetle in the family Mordellidae. It is found in North America.
