= Pseudotolida awana =

Scientific classification
- Domain: Eukaryota
- Kingdom: Animalia
- Phylum: Arthropoda
- Class: Insecta
- Order: Coleoptera
- Suborder: Polyphaga
- Infraorder: Cucujiformia
- Family: Mordellidae
- Genus: Pseudotolida
- Species: P. awana

Binomial name
- Pseudotolida awana (Kôno, 1932)

Synonyms
- Mordellistena awana Kôno, 1932

Species of beetle

Pseudotolida awana is a beetle in the genus Pseudotolida of the family Mordellidae. It was described in 1932 by Kôno.
