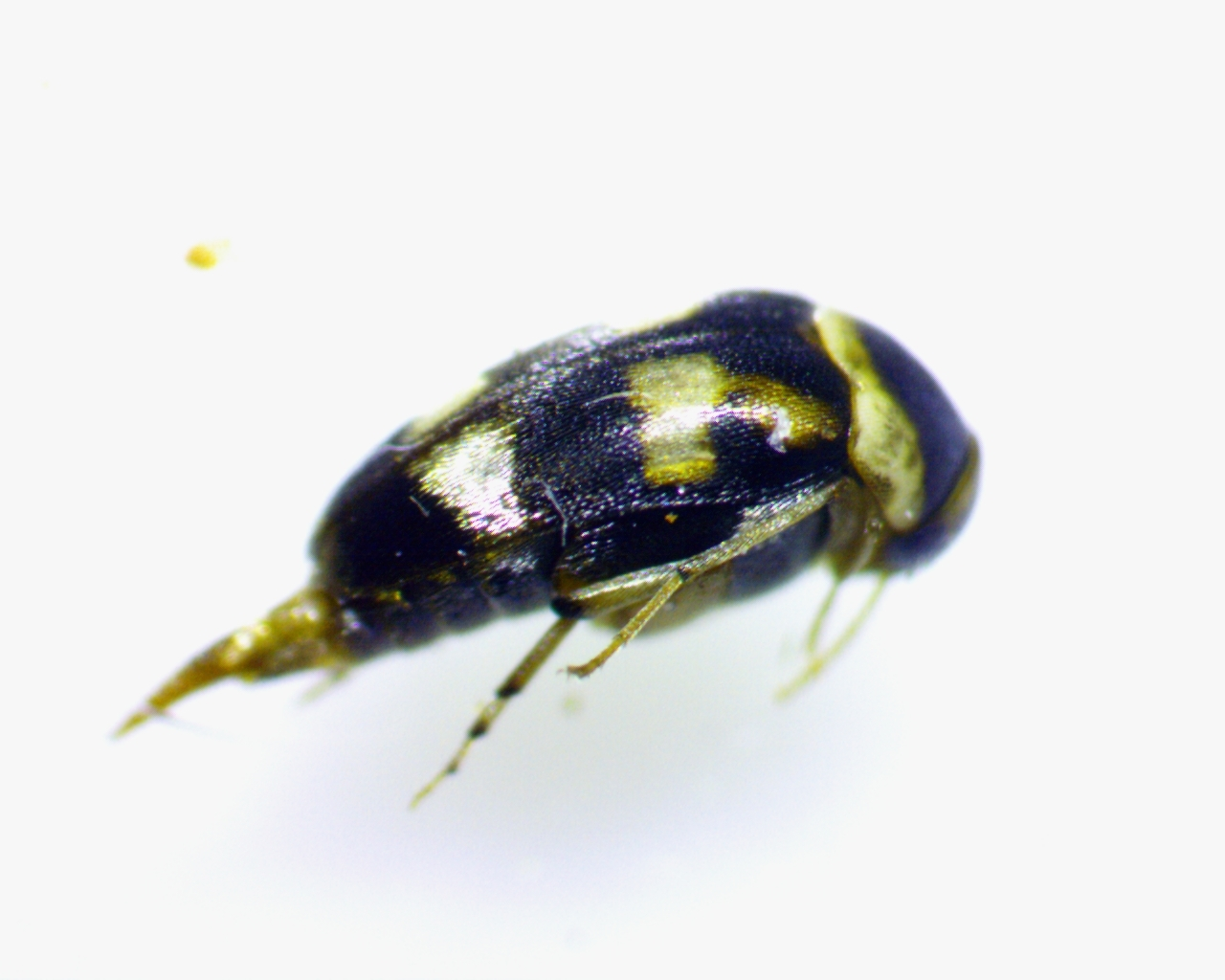
- Tolidomordella discoidea, North Carolina

Scientific classification
- Domain: Eukaryota
- Kingdom: Animalia
- Phylum: Arthropoda
- Class: Insecta
- Order: Coleoptera
- Suborder: Polyphaga
- Infraorder: Cucujiformia
- Family: Mordellidae
- Subfamily: Mordellinae
- Tribe: Mordellini
- Genus: Tolidomordella; Ermisch, 1950

= Tolidomordella =

Genus of beetles

Tolidomordella is a genus of tumbling flower beetles in the family Mordellidae. There are at least two described species in Tolidomordella.

== Species ==
These two species belong to the genus Tolidomordella:

- Tolidomordella discoidea (Melsheimer, 1845) (North America)
  - Tolidomordella discoidea discoidea (Melsheimer, 1845)
  - Tolidomordella discoidea flaviventris (Smith, 1883)
- Tolidomordella sexguttata (Champion, 1896) (Caribbean)
