= James Platt Barrett =

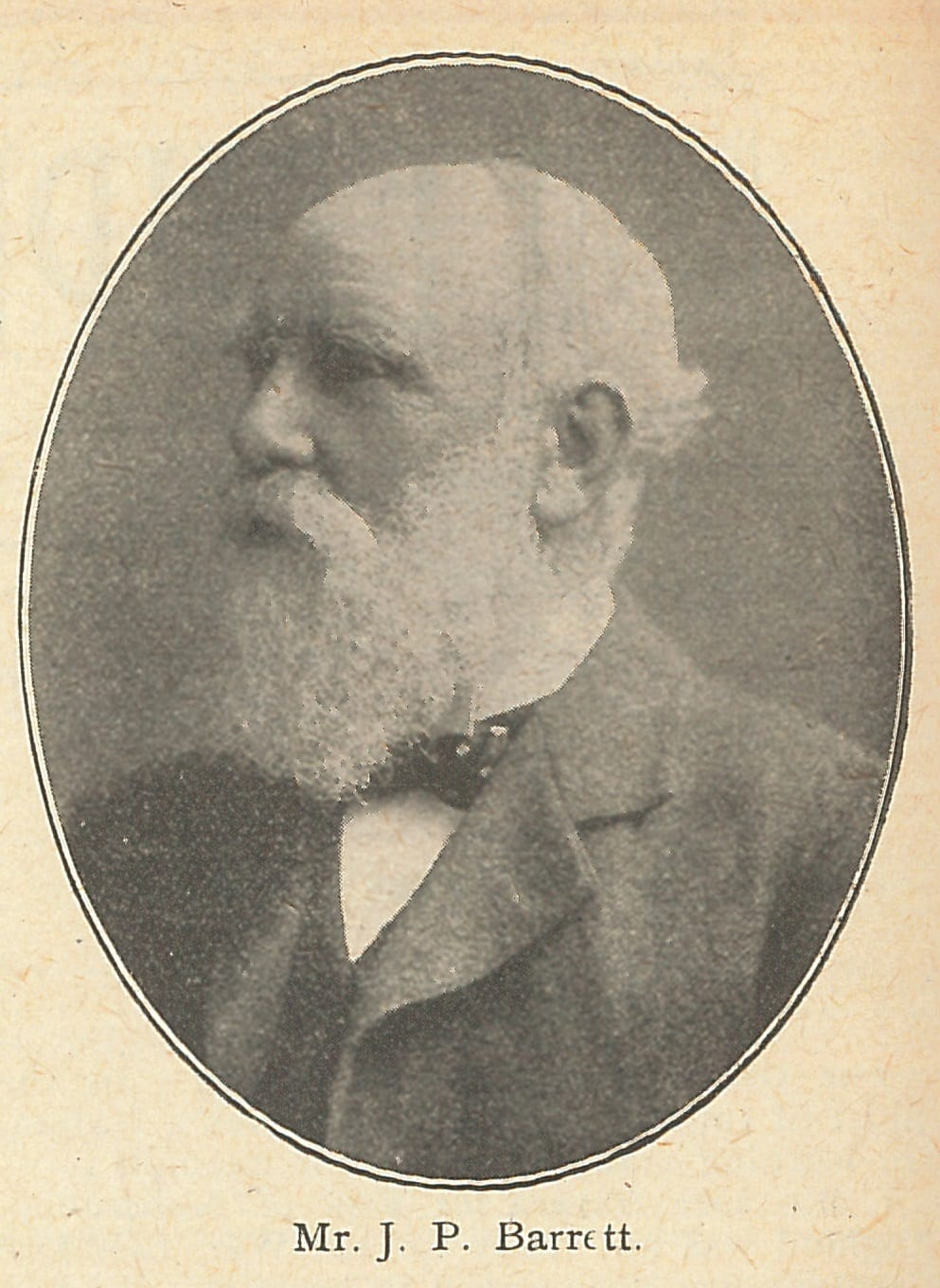
- Born: 1838
- Died: 27 December 1916 (aged 77–78)
- Occupations: Teacher, naturalist

James Platt Barrett (29 June 1838 – 27 December 1916) was an English teacher for the deaf and an amateur lepidopterist. He was one of the founding members of the South London Entomological and Natural History Society and taught at the Royal School for Deaf and Dumb Children at Margate for nearly fifty years.

Platt-Barrett may have had a hearing defect in his youth as he was educated at an institution for the deaf and dumb in Yorkshire. He was later noted as being able to communicate without any troubles. He became a teacher for the deaf and dumb. It is thought that he may have been inspired to study butterflies by Charles Baker who was a teacher of deaf children who published a book British Butterflies (1828) illustrated by his students at the Edgbaston Institution. Platt-Barrett travelled to Italy several times. On 28 December 1908, he narrowly escaped an earthquake in Messina but his daughter-in-law and her child were killed by the collapsing building and specimens and notes from months of collecting were destroyed. He was elected Fellow of the Entomological Society in 1911. He was buried at Birchington next to his wife who had predeceased him.
