= Ernest Candèze =

Belgian doctor and entomologist (1827–1898)

Ernest Charles Auguste Candèze
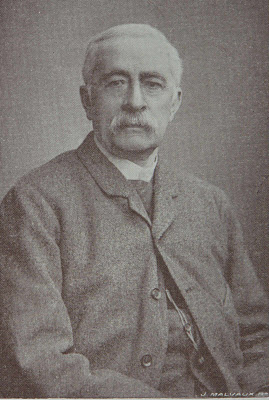
- Born: February 22, 1827; Liège, Belgium
- Died: June 30, 1898 (aged 71); Glain, Belgium
- Education: Liège, Paris
- Occupations: Doctor, Entomologist
- Known for: Revisions of Elateridae, writing scientific novels, foldable camera design
- Medical career
- Profession: Physician
- Field: Entomology
- Sub-specialties: Elateridae (click beetles)
- Notable works: Monographie of Elateridae, Aventures d'un grillon, Le Scénographe

Ernest Charles Auguste Candèze (22 February 1827, Liège – 30 June 1898, Glain) was a Belgian doctor and entomologist. He specialized in click beetles and was the father of the entomologist Léon Candèze.

Candèze was born in Liège where he studied under Jean Theodore Lacordaire (1801–1870), then studied medicine in Paris and Liège. Following Lacordaire's advice he joined the circle of entomologists in Liège which included his longtime friend Félicien Chapuis (1824–1879) as well as Edmond de Sélys Longchamps (1813–1900) and the English entomologist Robert McLachlan (1837–1904). He became the director of a hospital for the insane. He took part in the foundation of the Belgian Entomological Society. Lacordaire encouraged him to specialize in Elateridae on which he published revisions of which the very rare Monographie of Elateridae (four volumes, Liège, 1857–1863) is important. He was a friend of the French editor Pierre-Jules Hetzel (1814–1886) who pressed him to write scientific novels in order to popularize entomology to a larger audience: Aventures d'un grillon, Adventures of a cricket (Paris, 1877), La Gileppe, les infortunes d'une population d'insectes, Gileppe, misfortunes of a population of insects (Paris, 1879), which had a certain success, and Périnette, histoire surprenante de cinq moineaux... Périnette, surprising history of five sparrows... (Paris, 1886). Also impassioned by photography, he developed a foldable camera which was a great success in Europe (and which was accompanied by his book Le Scénographe, appareil photographique de poche..., Paris, 1875).
