= George Charles Champion =

British entomologist

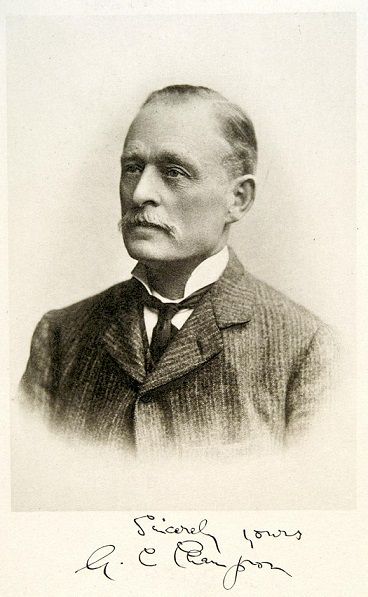

George Charles Champion (29 April 1851 – 8 August 1927) was an English entomologist specialising in the study of beetles.

== Biography ==
George was born in Walworth, South London, the eldest son of George Champion. Encouraged by J. Platt-Barret, G. C. Champion began collecting beetles when he was 16. Champion's initial work was mainly in the Home Counties. Recognized as a serious coleopterist, he accepted a post as collector for Frederick DuCane Godman and Osbert Salvin to work on Biologia Centrali-Americana. Champion left England in February 1879 for Guatemala, where he arrived on 16 March into Puerto San José on the Pacific. He then commenced several years of journeying with intensive specimen collecting, until 7 April 1881 when he travelled by boat to Panama. On 20 April 1881 he left Panama City for Chiriqui Province, where he stayed journeying and collecting until early 1883 before traveling back towards Panama City on 18 March 1883, then visiting a few places before leaving Panama on 21 May 1883. The collections are described in a series of articles he wrote to the Entomologist's Monthly Magazine, plus a route summary in Entomologica News (1907, Vol. XVIII, pp. 33–44). He successfully returned to England in 1883 with around 15,000 species of insects, many arachnids, and likely other diverse specimens. A former watchmaker, he was employed by Godman and Salvin as a secretary, and he saw through the press the 52 volumes of the Biologia Centrali-Americana. Champion also prepared the Coleoptera sections for publication and wrote the volumes and parts covering the Heteromera, the Elateridae and Dascillidae, the Cassidinae, and the Curculionidae. He described more than 4,000 species new to science in this work.

He published 426 articles, some in Annals and Magazine of Natural History, which he also edited. Much of his work was with exotic Coleoptera, but he also wrote faunistic papers, mainly on beetles from Woking, Surrey, where he lived.

From 1871, he was a fellow of the Royal Entomological Society of London, and a member of the Entomological Society Council from 1875 to 1877. He was librarian from 1891 to 1920, and appointed vice president in 1925. He compiled the Catalogue and Supplement of the Library. He was a fellow of the Linnean Society and of the Zoological Society of London. He also helped to found the South London Entomological and Natural History Society .

== Collections ==
Champion's beetle collection, including over 150,000 specimens and a very large number of types, is housed at the Natural History Museum, London. His specimens can be found in other major collections, such as the Hope Department of Entomology, Oxford.

== Legacy ==
Champion is commemorated in the scientific names of a species of Panamanian snake, Geophis championi Boulenger, 1894, and several species of beetle, including Clinidium championi. (found in Guatemala), Zopherus championi Triplehorn (found in Central and North America), and a species in the genus Phaleria, Phaleria championi Triplehorn and Watrous.
