= List of Diaperinae genera =

These genera belong to Diaperinae, a subfamily of darkling beetles in the family Tenebrionidae.

== Diaperinae genera ==
- Adelina Dejean, 1835 (North America, the Neotropics, the Palearctic, Indomalaya, and Australasia)
- Ades Guérin-Méneville, 1857 (the Palearctic, tropical Africa, Indomalaya, Australasia, and Oceania)
- Alphitophagus Stephens, 1832 (North America, tropical Africa, Australasia, and Oceania)
- Anommabates Koch, 1956 (tropical Africa)
- Anopidium Jeannel & Paulian, 1945 (tropical Africa)
- Apteroseriscius Koch, 1950 (tropical Africa)
- Arabcynaeus Schawaller, 2009 (the Palearctic)
- Araeopselaphus Gebien, 1921 (tropical Africa)
- Basanus Lacordaire, 1859 (the Palearctic and Indomalaya)
- Basides Motschulsky, 1873 (the Palearctic, Indomalaya, and Australasia)
- Betschia Dajoz, 1980 (tropical Africa)
- Brittona G.S. Medvedev & Lawrence, 1986 (Australasia)
- Caecochares Koch, 1956 (tropical Africa)
- Caecophloeus Dajoz, 1972 (the Neotropics)
- Capicrypticus Koch, 1950 (tropical Africa)
- Cechenosternum Gebien, 1921 (the Palearctic, tropical Africa, and Indomalaya)
- Ceropria Laporte & Brullé, 1831 (the Neotropics, tropical Africa, Indomalaya, Australasia, and Oceania)
- Cheilopoma Murray, 1867 (tropical Africa)
- Cissides Chatanay, 1915 (tropical Africa)
- Coelopleurum Gebien, 1921 (tropical Africa)
- Corticeus Piller & Mitterpacher, 1783 (worldwide)
- Cosmonota Blanchard, 1842 (the Neotropics)
- Crypsis C.O. Waterhouse, 1877 (the Palearctic and Indomalaya)
- Crypticus Latreille, 1816 (the Palearctic)
- Cryptozoon Schaufuss, 1882 (the Neotropics)
- Csiro G.S. Medvedev & Lawrence, 1984 (Australasia)
- Cyclobiomorphus Pic, 1916 (Indomalaya)
- Cyclobium Pic, 1916 (Indomalaya)
- Cynaeus Leconte, 1862 (North America, the Palearctic, and Australasia)
- Derispia Lewis, 1894 (the Palearctic, Indomalaya, and Australasia)
- Derispiella Kaszab, 1961 (Indomalaya)
- Derispiola Kaszab, 1946 (Indomalaya)
- Diaperis Geoffroy, 1762 (North America, the Neotropics, the Palearctic, and Indomalaya)
- Doliodesmus Spilman, 1967 (North America)
- Doliopines Horn, 1894 (North America)
- Ectyche Pascoe, 1869 (Australasia)
- Ellipsodes Wollaston, 1854 (the Neotropics, tropical Africa, Indomalaya, Australasia, and Oceania)
- Emypsara Pascoe, 1866 (the Palearctic)
- Enanea Lewis, 1894 (the Palearctic and Indomalaya)
- Espagnolina Kaszab, 1965 (Indomalaya)
- Exapinaeus Pascoe, 1882 (the Neotropics)
- Falsocosmonota Kaszab, 1962 (Indomalaya)
- Gargilius Fairmaire, 1891 (tropical Africa)
- Gnathidium Gebien, 1921 (tropical Africa)
- Gnatocerus Thunberg, 1814 (worldwide)
- Gondwanocrypticus Español, 1955 (North America and the Neotropics)
- Gressittiola Kaszab, 1955 (Australasia)
- Halammobia Semenov, 1901 (the Palearctic)
- Heterophylus Klug, 1833 (tropical Africa)
- Hoplaspis Motschulsky, 1858 (Indomalaya)
- Hyocis Pascoe, 1866 (Australasia)
- Iccius Champion, 1886 (North America and the Neotropics)
- Ischnarthron Gebien, 1921 (tropical Africa)
- Lamprocrypticus Español, 1950 (the Palearctic)
- Laoscapha Schawaller, 2016 (Indomalaya)
- Leiochrinus Westwood, 1883 (the Palearctic, Indomalaya, and Australasia)
- Leiochrodinus Kaszab, 1961 (Indomalaya)
- Leiochrodontes Kaszab, 1946 (Indomalaya)
- Leiochrota Westwood, 1883 (Indomalaya)
- Lelegeis Champion, 1886 (the Neotropics)
- Lineocrypticus Koch, 1950 (tropical Africa)
- Liodema Horn, 1870 (North America and the Neotropics)
- Louwerensia Kaszab, 1964 (Australasia)
- Loxostethus Triplehorn, 1962 (the Neotropics)
- Macrotrachyscelis Pic, 1925 (tropical Africa)
- Magela G.S. Medvedev & Lawrence, 1986 (Australasia)
- Mauritianopidium Dajoz, 1977 (tropical Africa)
- Menimopsis Champion, 1896 (the Neotropics)
- Menimus Sharp, 1876 (the Palearctic, Indomalaya, Australasia, and Oceania)
- Micrectyche Bates, 1873 (Australasia)
- Microcrypticus Gebien, 1921 (tropical Africa and Indomalaya)
- Micropeneta Pic, 1921 (Indomalaya)
- Mireanopidium Dajoz, 1977 (tropical Africa)
- Mophis Champion, 1886 (the Neotropics)
- Myonophloeus Bremer & Lillig, 2017 (the Neotropics)
- Myrmechixenus Chevrolat, 1835 (North America, tropical Africa, Indomalaya, Australasia, and Oceania)
- Myrmecocatops Wasmann, 1897 (tropical Africa)
- Nanocaecus Schawaller & Purchart, 2012 (tropical Africa)
- Neanopidium Dajoz, 1975 (the Neotropics)
- Neomida Latreille, 1829 (North America, the Neotropics, the Palearctic, and Indomalaya)
- Neoplateia Marcuzzi, 1986 (the Neotropics)
- Oochrotus P.H. Lucas, 1852 (the Palearctic)
- Pachyphaleria Gebien, 1920 (tropical Africa)
- Palembomimus Matthews & Lawrence, 2005 (Australasia)
- Paniasis Champion, 1886 (the Neotropics)
- Parahyocis Kaszab, 1955 (Australasia and Oceania)
- Paralyreus Grouvelle, 1918 (tropical Africa)
- Paranemia Heyden, 1892 (the Palearctic)
- Paranopidium Dajoz, 1974 (tropical Africa)
- Pelleas Bates, 1872 (the Palearctic)
- Pentaphyllus Dejean, 1821 (worldwide)
- Peyrierasia Dajoz, 1975 (tropical Africa)
- Phaleria Latreille, 1802 (worldwide)
- Phaleromela Reitter, 1916 (North America and the Palearctic)
- Phayllus Champion, 1886 (the Neotropics)
- Phtora Germar, 1836 (the Palearctic and tropical Africa)
- Pimplema Pascoe, 1887 (Indomalaya and Australasia)
- Platydema Laporte & Brullé, 1831 (worldwide)
- Platydemoides Kaszab, 1980 (Indomalaya)
- Poecilocrypticus Gebien, 1928 (North America and the Neotropics)
- Pogonoxenus Wasmann, 1899 (tropical Africa)
- Prototyrtaeus Spiessberger & Ivie, 2020 (the Neotropics)
- Pseudanopidium Dajoz, 1974 (tropical Africa)
- Pseudobasides Pic, 1916 (Indomalaya)
- Pseudoenanea Pic, 1924 (Indomalaya)
- Pseudoscaphidema Pic, 1926 (the Palearctic)
- Pseudoseriscius Español, 1950 (the Palearctic and tropical Africa)
- Sakaiomenimus Ando, 2003 (the Palearctic)
- Saptine Champion, 1886 (the Neotropics)
- Scaphidema Redtenbacher, 1848 (North America, the Palearctic, and Indomalaya)
- Sciophagus Sharp, 1885 (Australasia and Oceania)
- Sitophagus Mulsant, 1854 (North America and the Neotropics)
- Sphaerognathium Dajoz, 1975 (the Neotropics)
- Spiloscapha Bates, 1873 (the Palearctic, Indomalaya, and Australasia)
- Stenoscapha Bates, 1873 (the Neotropics)
- Stethotrypes Gebien, 1914 (Indomalaya)
- Stomylus Fåhraeus, 1870 (tropical Africa)
- Szentivanya Kaszab, 1958 (Australasia)
- Taiwanomenimus Masumoto, Akita & Lee, 2019 (Indomalaya)
- Taiwanotrachyscelis Masumoto, Akita & Lee, 2012 (Indomalaya)
- Trachyscelis Latreille, 1809 (North America, the Palearctic, Indomalaya, Australasia, and Oceania)
- Triplehornia Matthews & Lawrence, 2005 (Australasia)
- Typhlophloeus Jeannel & Paulian, 1945 (the Palearctic and tropical Africa)
- Tyrtaeus Champion, 1913 (the Neotropics, tropical Africa, and Australasia)
- Ulomoides Blackburn, 1888 (the Neotropics, tropical Africa, Australasia, and Oceania)
- Uptona G.S. Medvedev & Lawrence, 1986 (Australasia)
- Yamatotakeru Ando, 2015 (the Palearctic and Indomalaya)
- † Palaeobasanus Nabozhenko & Kirejtshuk, 2020
