= Myrmecoxenus =

Myrmecoxenus may refer to:

- Myrmecoxenus, a genus of arachnids in the family Linyphiidae; synonym of Myrmecomelix
- Myrmecoxenus, a genus of beetles in the family Tenebrionidae; synonym of Myrmechixenus
