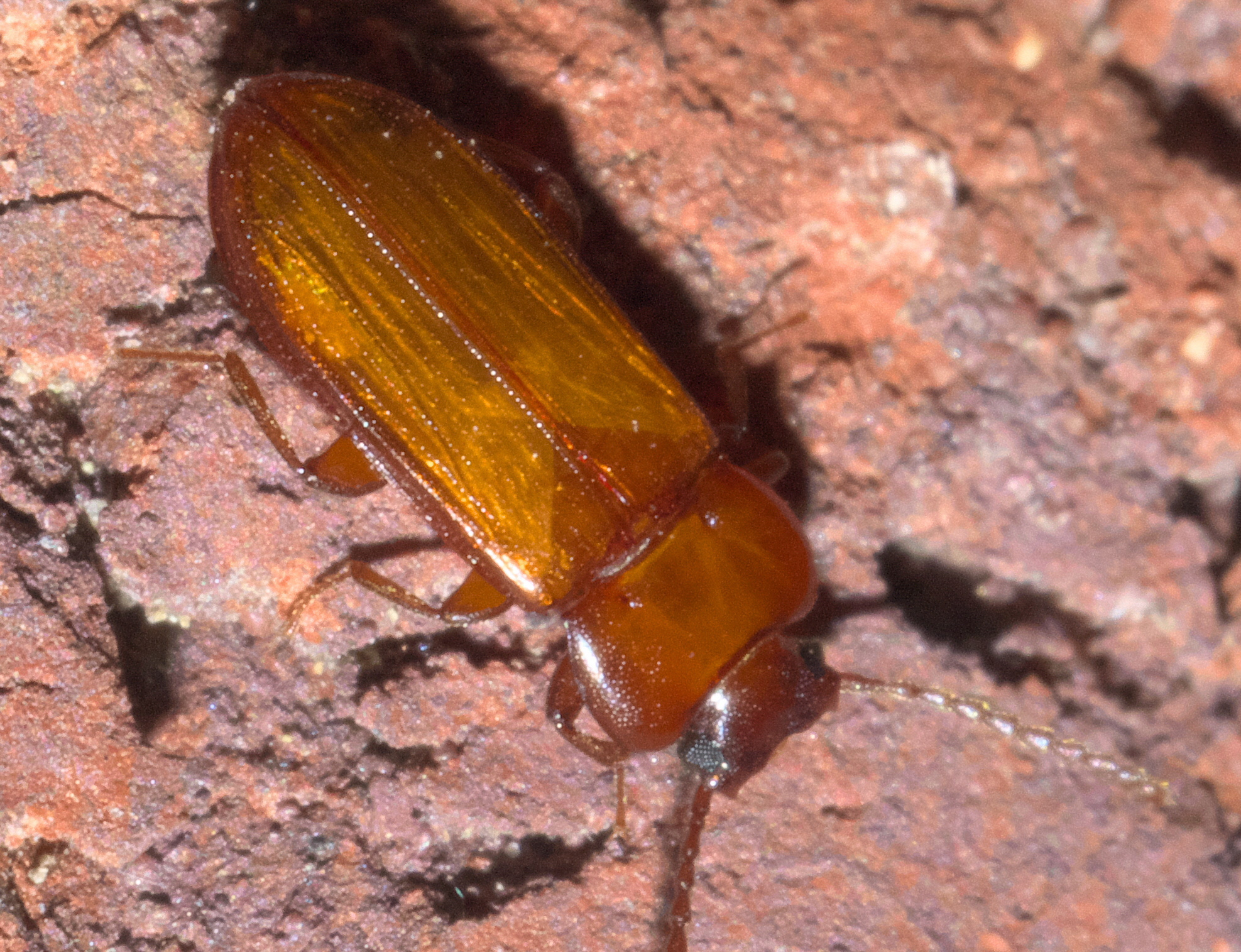
- Adelina

Scientific classification
- Kingdom: Animalia
- Phylum: Arthropoda
- Class: Insecta
- Order: Coleoptera
- Suborder: Polyphaga
- Infraorder: Cucujiformia
- Family: Tenebrionidae
- Subfamily: Diaperinae
- Tribe: Diaperini; Latreille, 1802

= Diaperini =

Tribe of beetles

Diaperini is a tribe of darkling beetles in the family Tenebrionidae. There are about 13 genera and at least 40 described species in Diaperini.

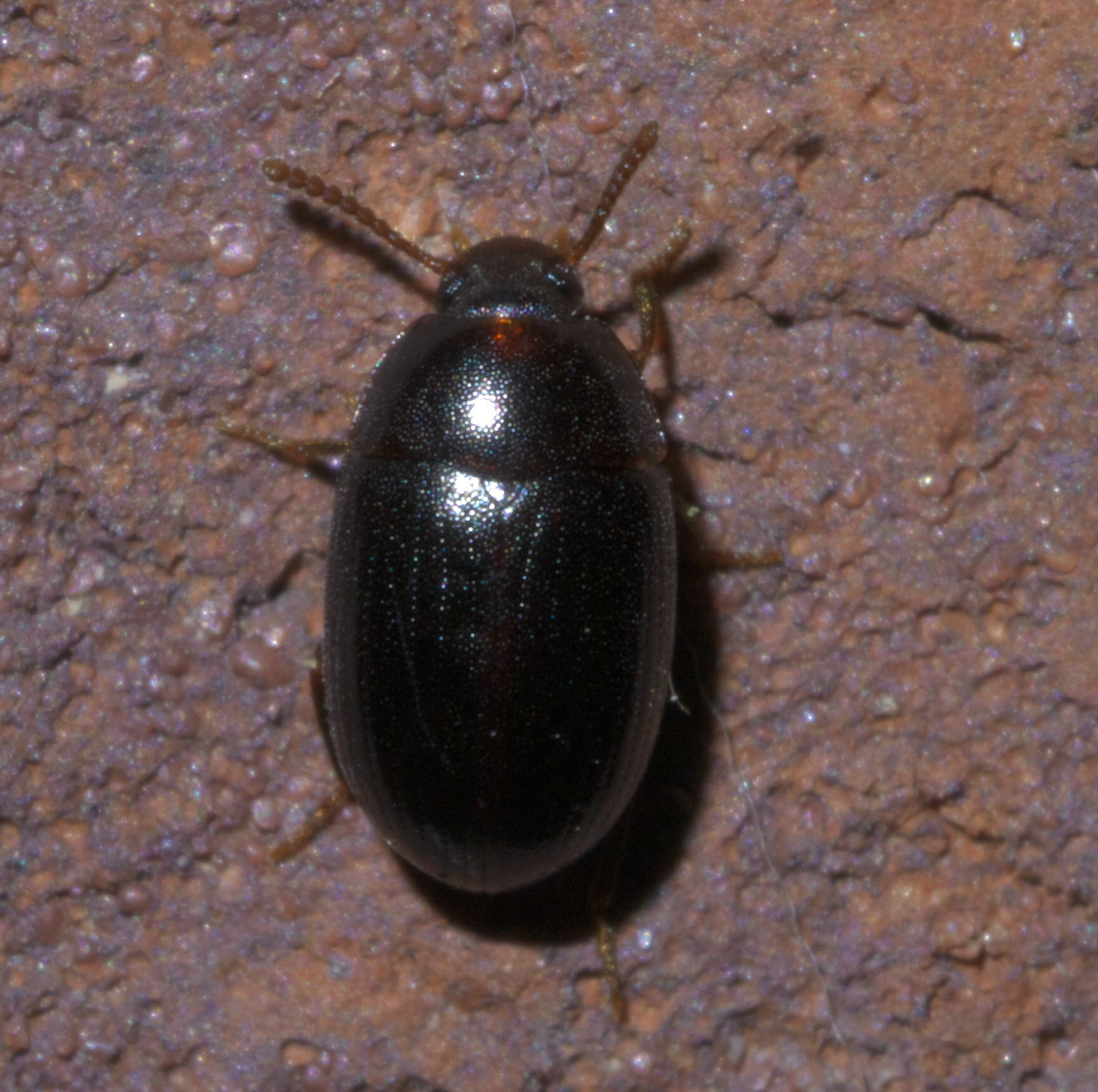
Platydema subcostatum

== Genera ==
These 13 genera belong to the tribe Diaperini:

- Adelina Dejean, 1835^{i c g b}
- Alphitophagus Stephens, 1832^{g b}
- Cynaeus Leconte, 1862^{g b}
- Diaperis Geoffroy, 1762^{i c g b}
- Doliodesmus Spilman, 1967^{g b}
- Gnatocerus Thunberg, 1814^{g b}
- Iccius Champion, 1886^{g b}
- Liodema Horn, 1870^{g b}
- Neomida Latreille, 1829^{g b}
- Pentaphyllus Dejean, 1821^{g b}
- Platydema Laporte & Brullé, 1831^{i c g b}
- Sitophagus Mulsant, 1854^{g b}
- Ulomoides Blackburn, 1888^{g b}

Data sources: i = ITIS, c = Catalogue of Life, g = GBIF, b = Bugguide.net
