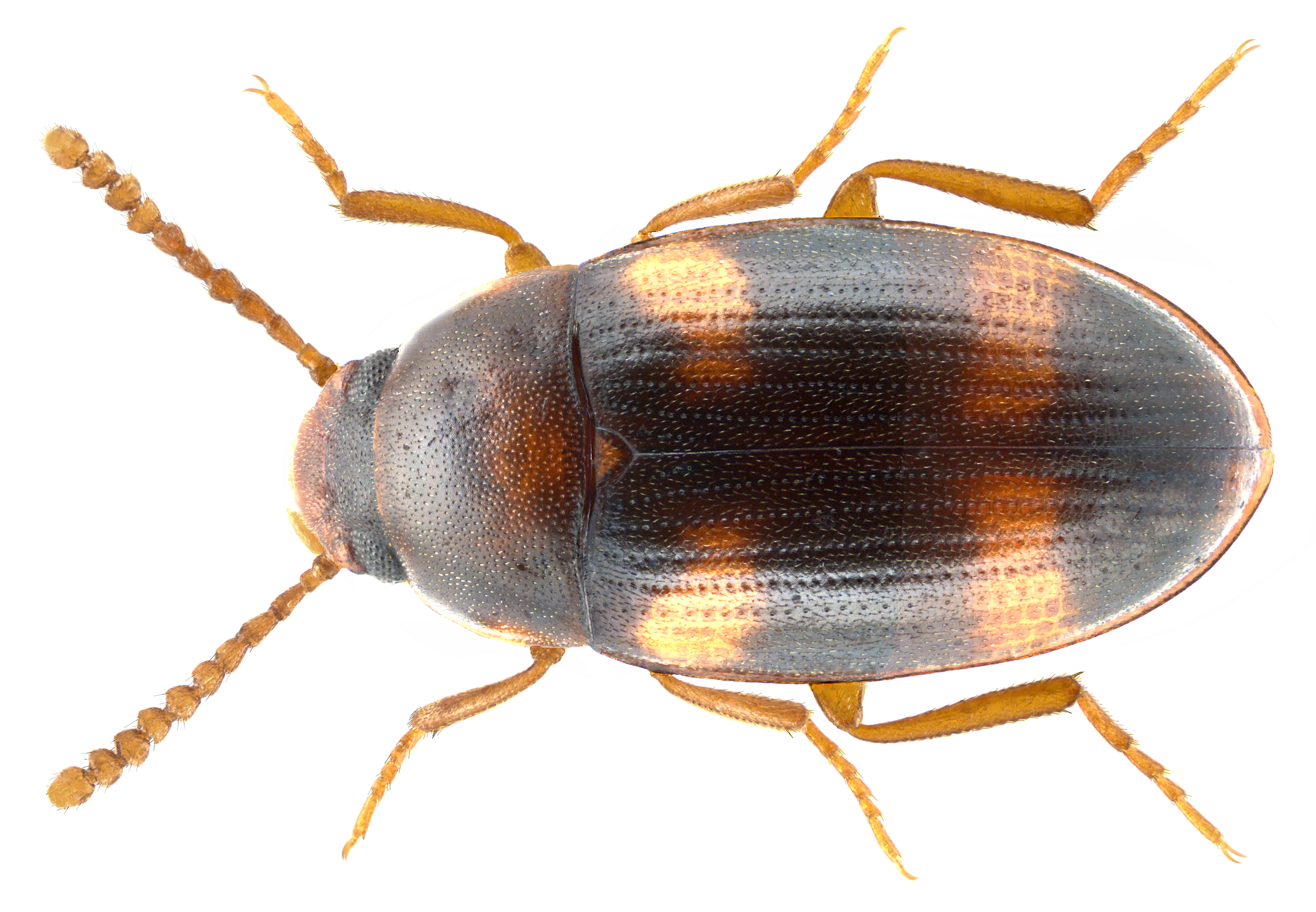
- Alphitophagus bifasciatus

Scientific classification
- Domain: Eukaryota
- Kingdom: Animalia
- Phylum: Arthropoda
- Class: Insecta
- Order: Coleoptera
- Suborder: Polyphaga
- Infraorder: Cucujiformia
- Family: Tenebrionidae
- Subfamily: Diaperinae
- Tribe: Diaperini
- Subtribe: Adelinina
- Genus: Alphitophagus; Stephens, 1832

Synonyms
- Phylethus Dejean, 1821

= Alphitophagus =

Genus of beetles

Alphitophagus is a genus of beetles belonging to the family Tenebrionidae.

The genus was first described by Stephens in 1832.

The genus has almost cosmopolitan distribution.

Species:

- Alphitophagus bifasciatus (Say, 1824)
- Alphitophagus carteianus Castro Tovar, Torres & Baena, 2012
