= Platydema subcostatum =

Scientific classification
- Domain: Eukaryota
- Kingdom: Animalia
- Phylum: Arthropoda
- Class: Insecta
- Order: Coleoptera
- Suborder: Polyphaga
- Infraorder: Cucujiformia
- Family: Tenebrionidae
- Genus: Platydema
- Species: P. subcostatum

Binomial name
- Platydema subcostatum Laporte & Brullé, 1831

Species of beetle

Platydema subcostatum is a species of darkling beetle in the family Tenebrionidae.
