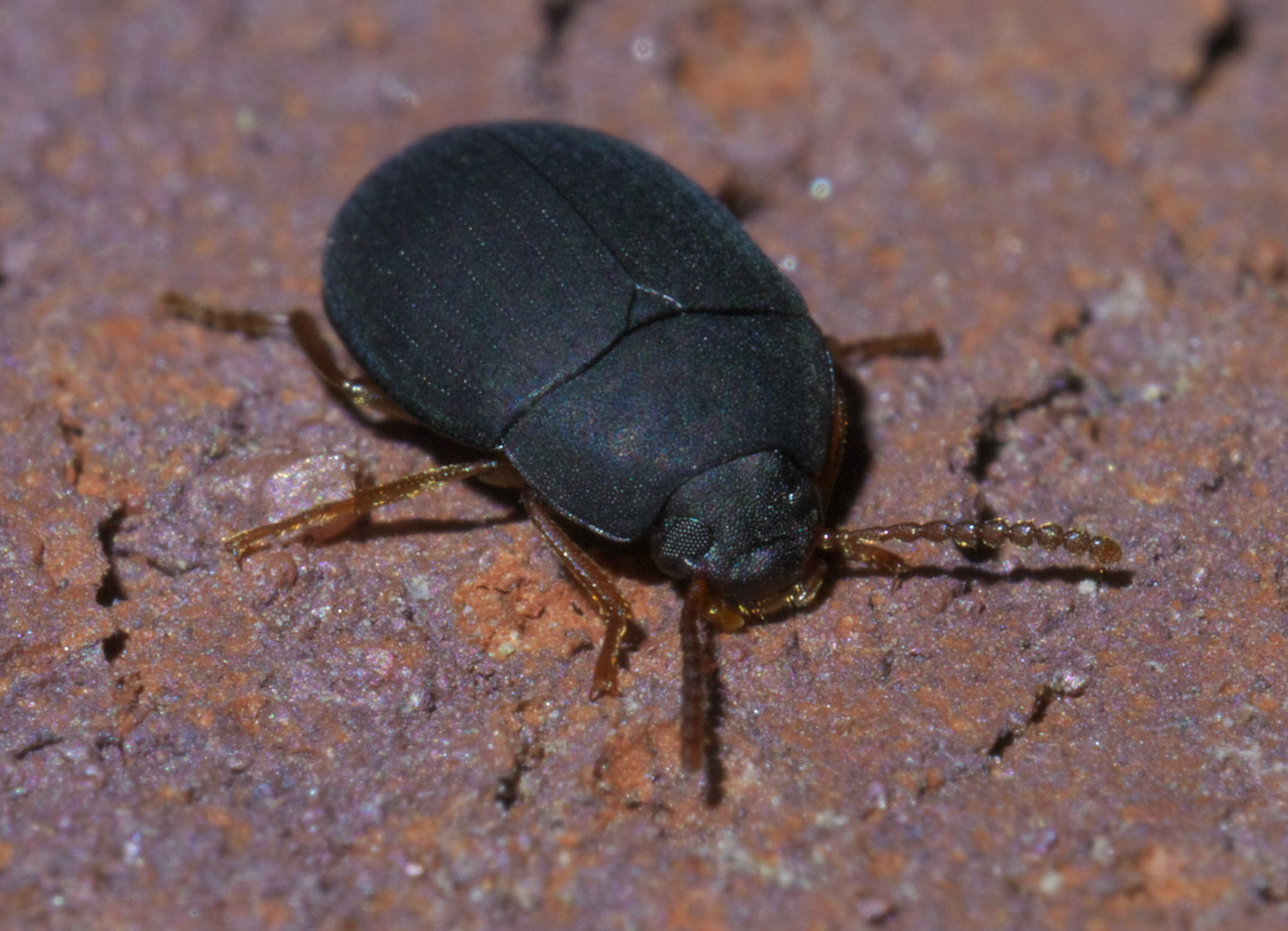

Scientific classification
- Domain: Eukaryota
- Kingdom: Animalia
- Phylum: Arthropoda
- Class: Insecta
- Order: Coleoptera
- Suborder: Polyphaga
- Infraorder: Cucujiformia
- Family: Tenebrionidae
- Genus: Platydema
- Species: P. ruficorne

Binomial name
- Platydema ruficorne (Sturm, 1826)

= Platydema ruficorne =

Species of beetle

Platydema ruficorne is a species of darkling beetle in the family Tenebrionidae.

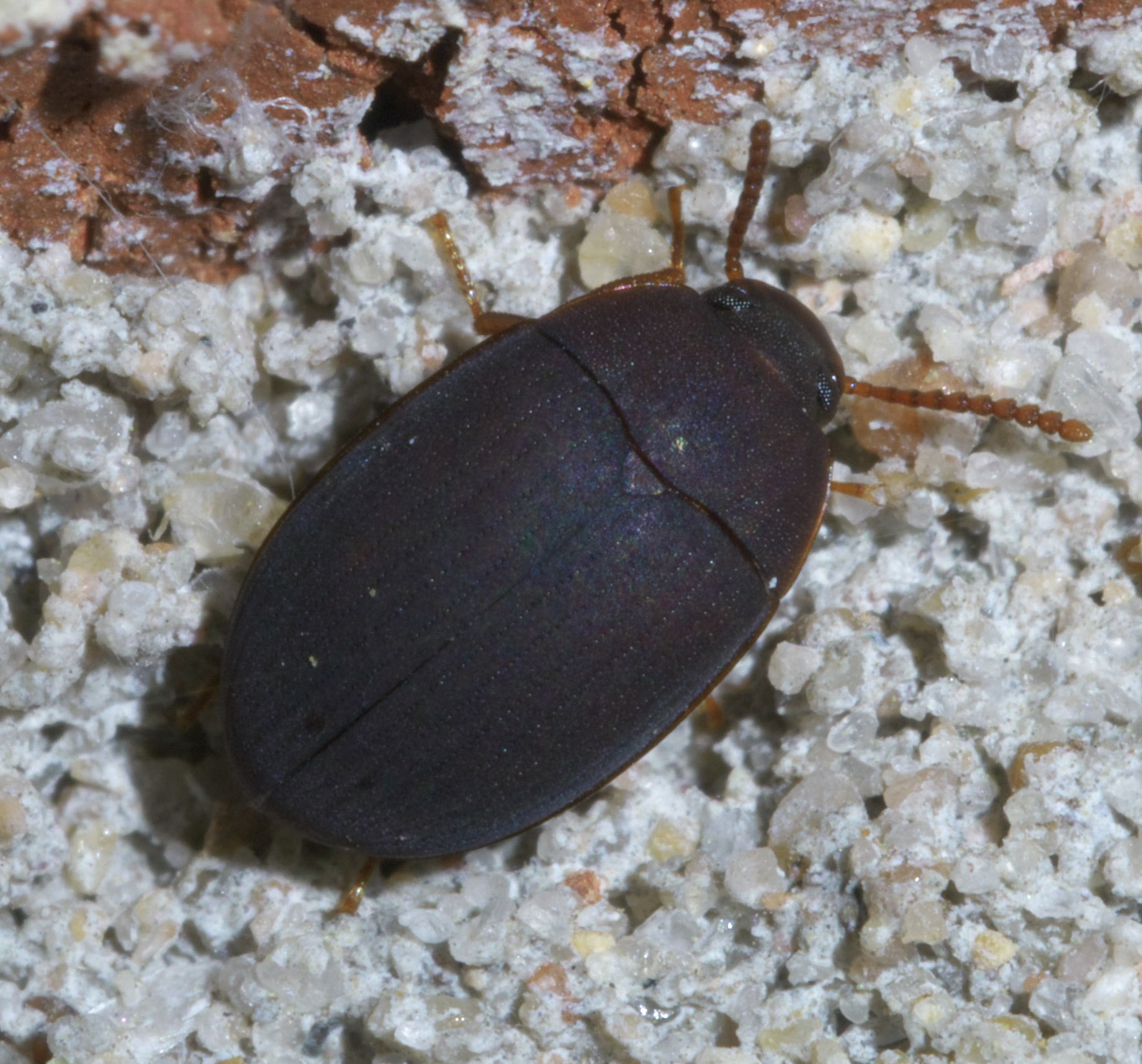
