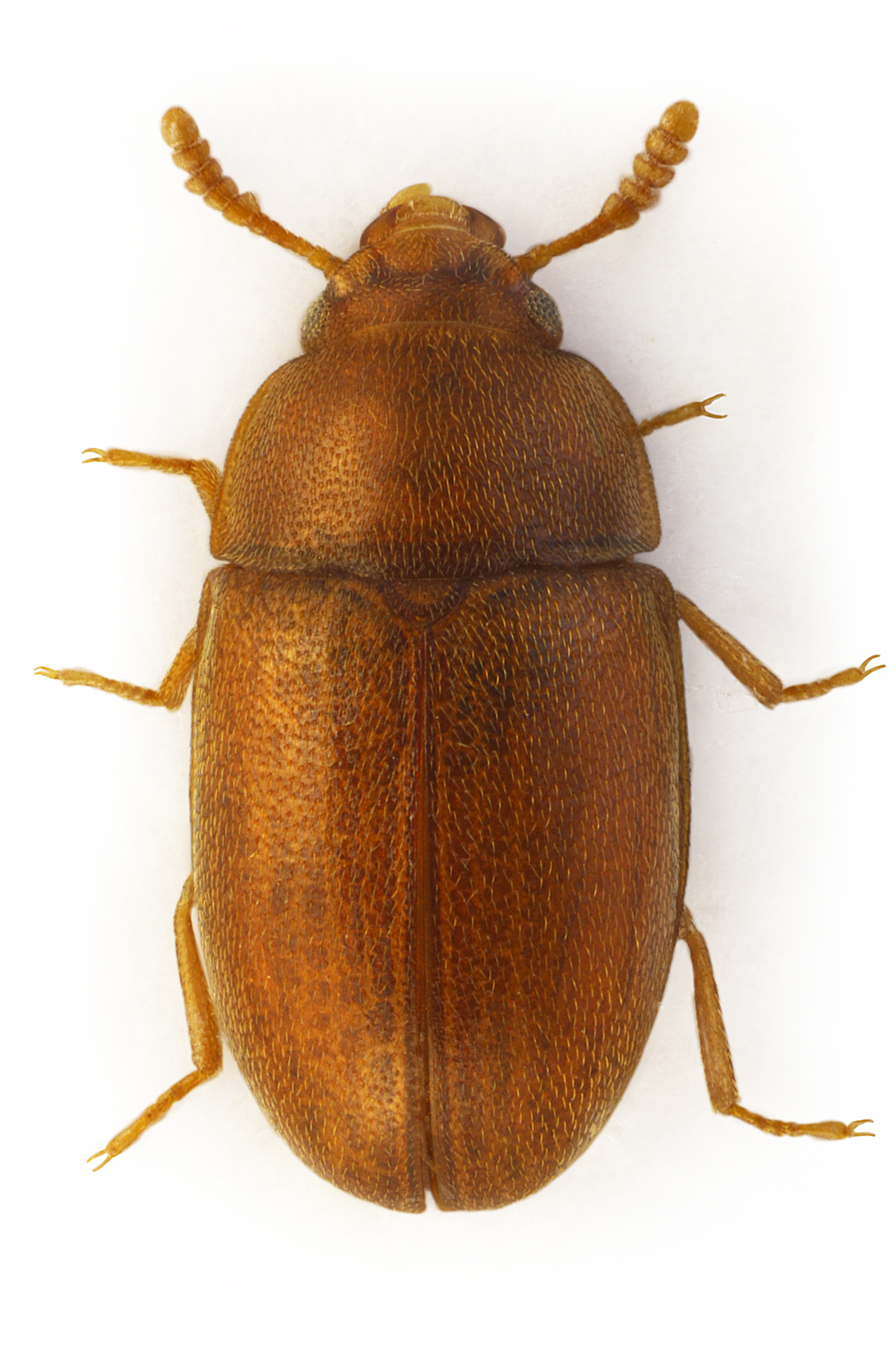

Scientific classification
- Kingdom: Animalia
- Phylum: Arthropoda
- Clade: Pancrustacea
- Class: Insecta
- Order: Coleoptera
- Suborder: Polyphaga
- Infraorder: Cucujiformia
- Family: Tenebrionidae
- Genus: Pentaphyllus
- Species: P. testaceus

Binomial name
- Pentaphyllus testaceus (Hellwig, 1792)

= Pentaphyllus testaceus =

Species of beetle

Pentaphyllus testaceus is a species of darkling beetle in the family Tenebrionidae.
