= Iccius (beetle) =

Scientific classification
- Kingdom: Animalia
- Phylum: Arthropoda
- Class: Insecta
- Order: Coleoptera
- Suborder: Polyphaga
- Infraorder: Cucujiformia
- Family: Tenebrionidae
- Subfamily: Diaperinae
- Tribe: Diaperini
- Genus: Iccius; Champion, 1886

Genus of insects

Iccius is a genus of beetles belonging to the family Tenebrionidae.

The species of this genus are found in America.

Species:

- Iccius cephalotes Champion, 1886
- Iccius cylindricus Champion, 1886
