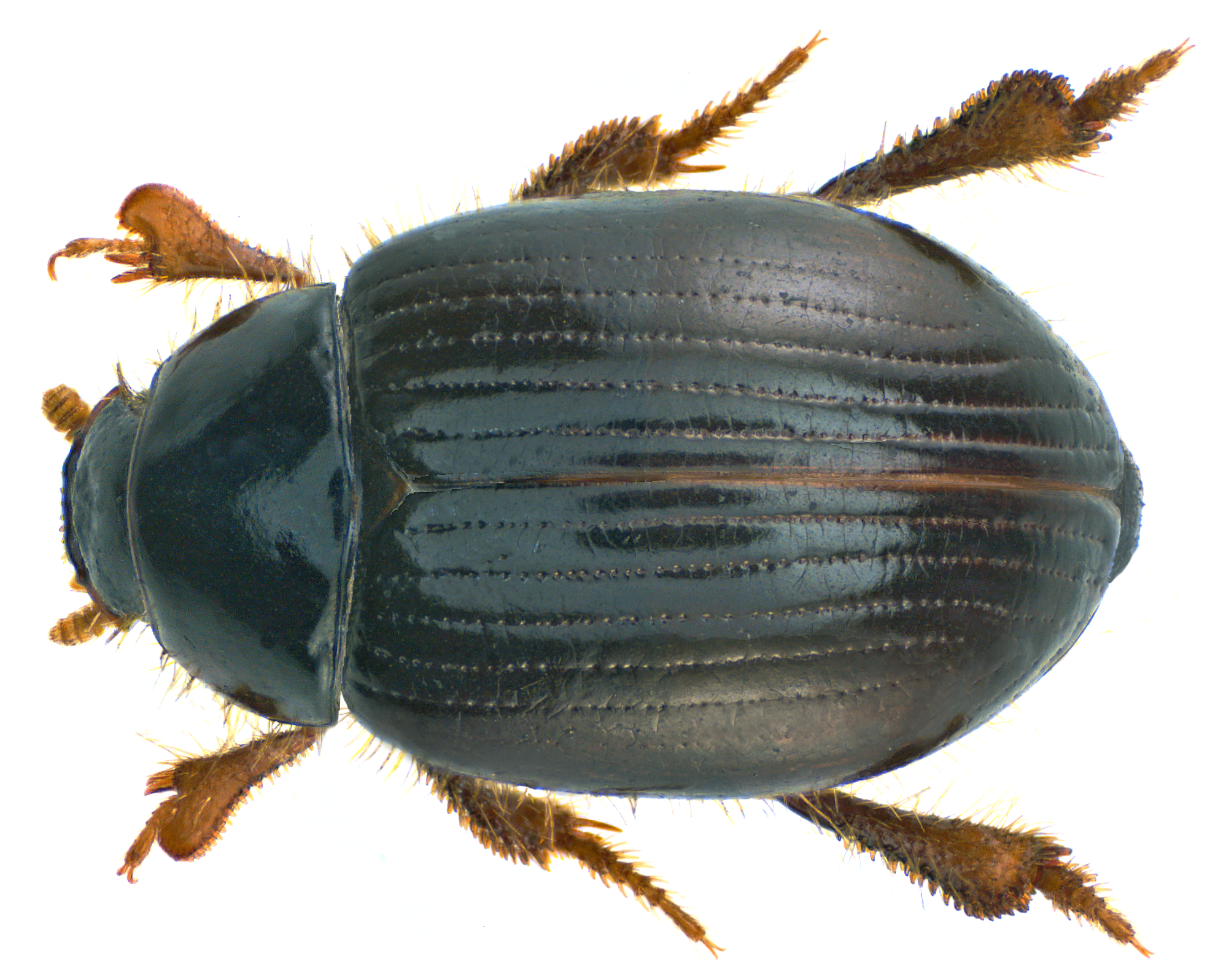

Scientific classification
- Kingdom: Animalia
- Phylum: Arthropoda
- Class: Insecta
- Order: Coleoptera
- Suborder: Polyphaga
- Infraorder: Cucujiformia
- Family: Tenebrionidae
- Genus: Trachyscelis
- Species: T. aphodioides

Binomial name
- Trachyscelis aphodioides Latreille, 1809

= Trachyscelis aphodioides =

Species of beetle

Trachyscelis aphodioides is a species of darkling beetle in the family Tenebrionidae.
