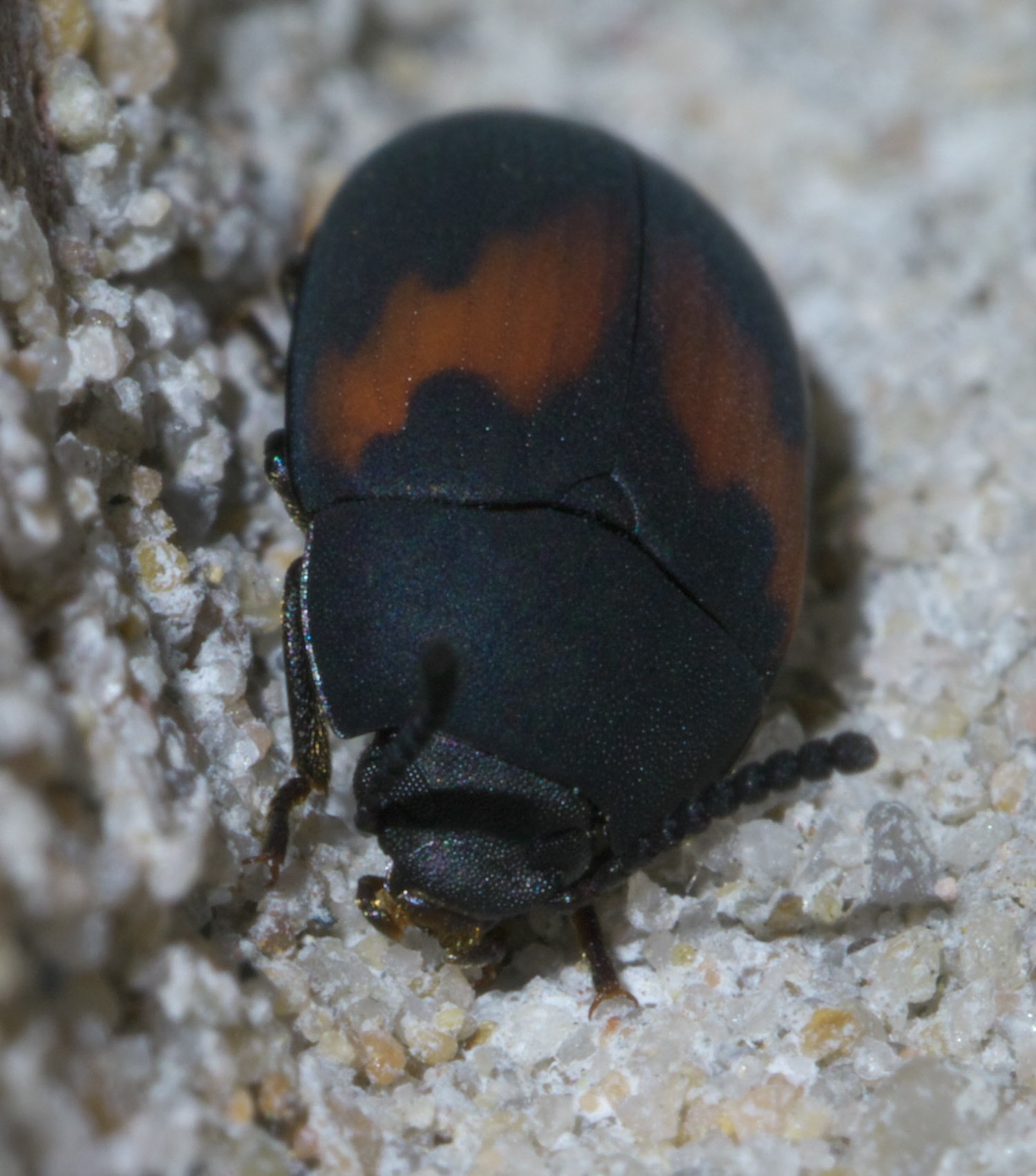

Scientific classification
- Kingdom: Animalia
- Phylum: Arthropoda
- Class: Insecta
- Order: Coleoptera
- Suborder: Polyphaga
- Infraorder: Cucujiformia
- Family: Tenebrionidae
- Genus: Platydema
- Species: P. ellipticum

Binomial name
- Platydema ellipticum (Fabricius, 1798)

= Platydema ellipticum =

Species of beetle

Platydema ellipticum is a species of darkling beetle in the family Tenebrionidae.

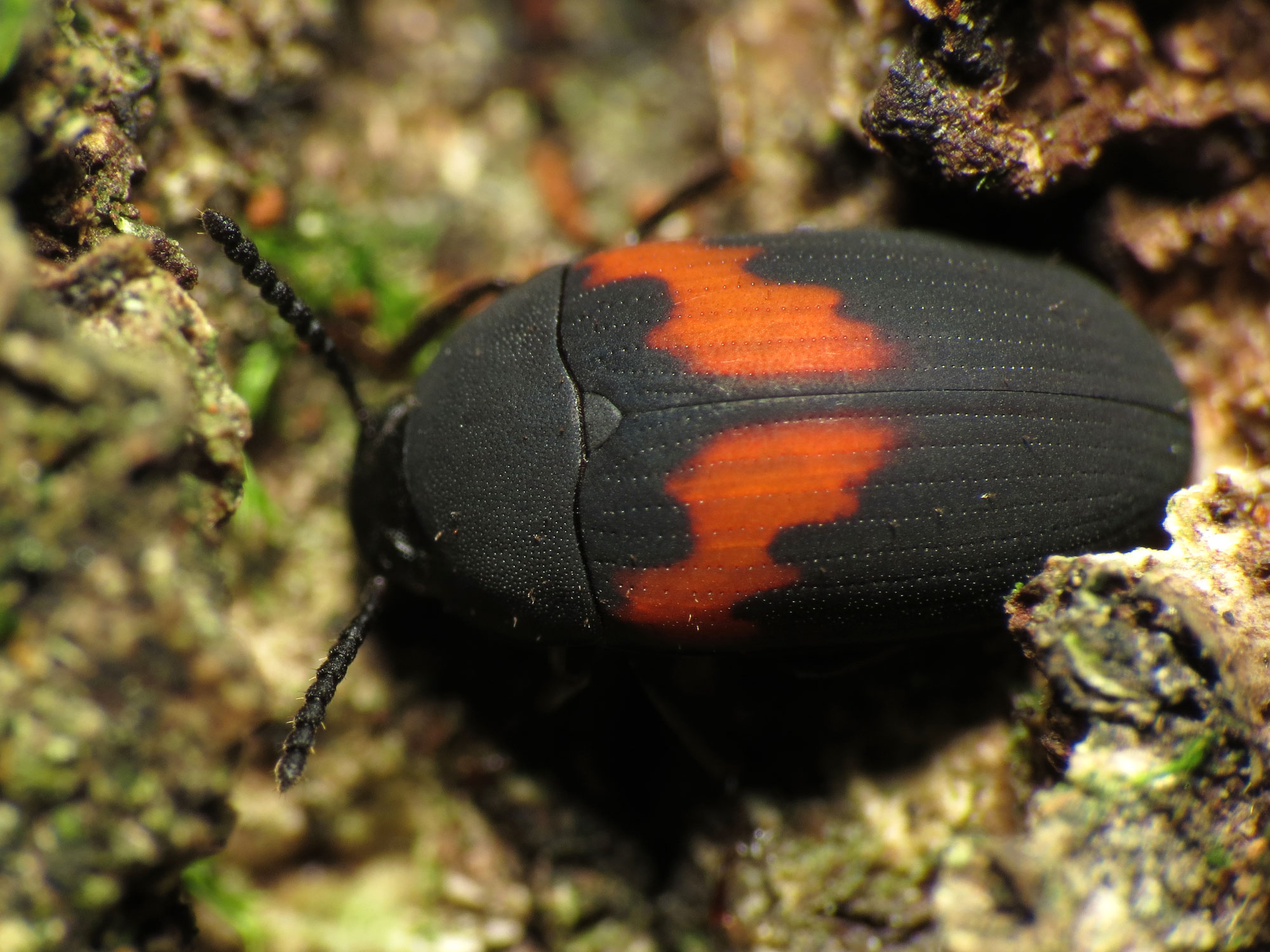
