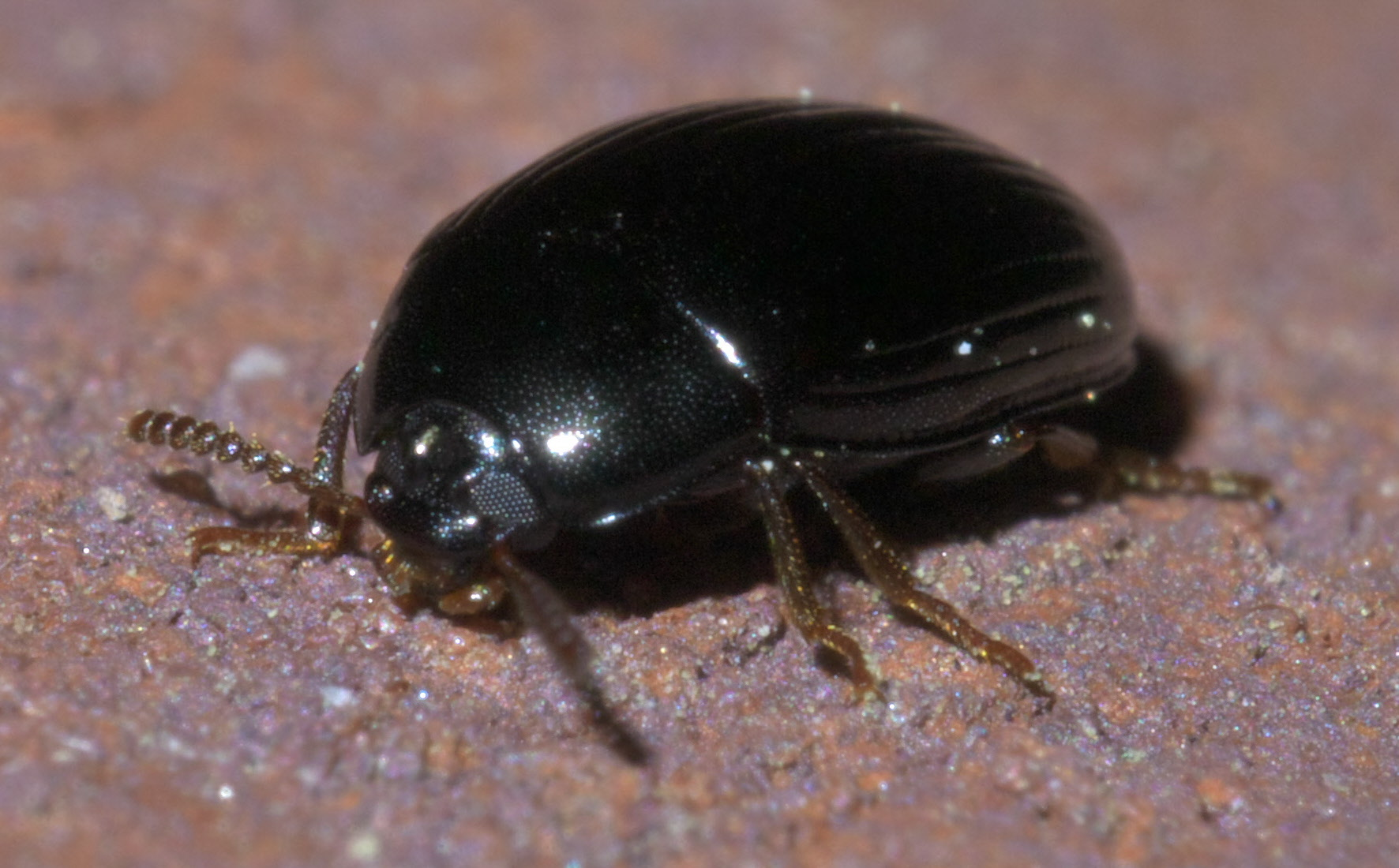

Scientific classification
- Kingdom: Animalia
- Phylum: Arthropoda
- Clade: Pancrustacea
- Class: Insecta
- Order: Coleoptera
- Suborder: Polyphaga
- Infraorder: Cucujiformia
- Family: Tenebrionidae
- Genus: Platydema
- Species: P. excavatum

Binomial name
- Platydema excavatum (Say, 1824)

= Platydema excavatum =

Species of beetle

Platydema excavatum is a species of darkling beetle in the family Tenebrionidae.

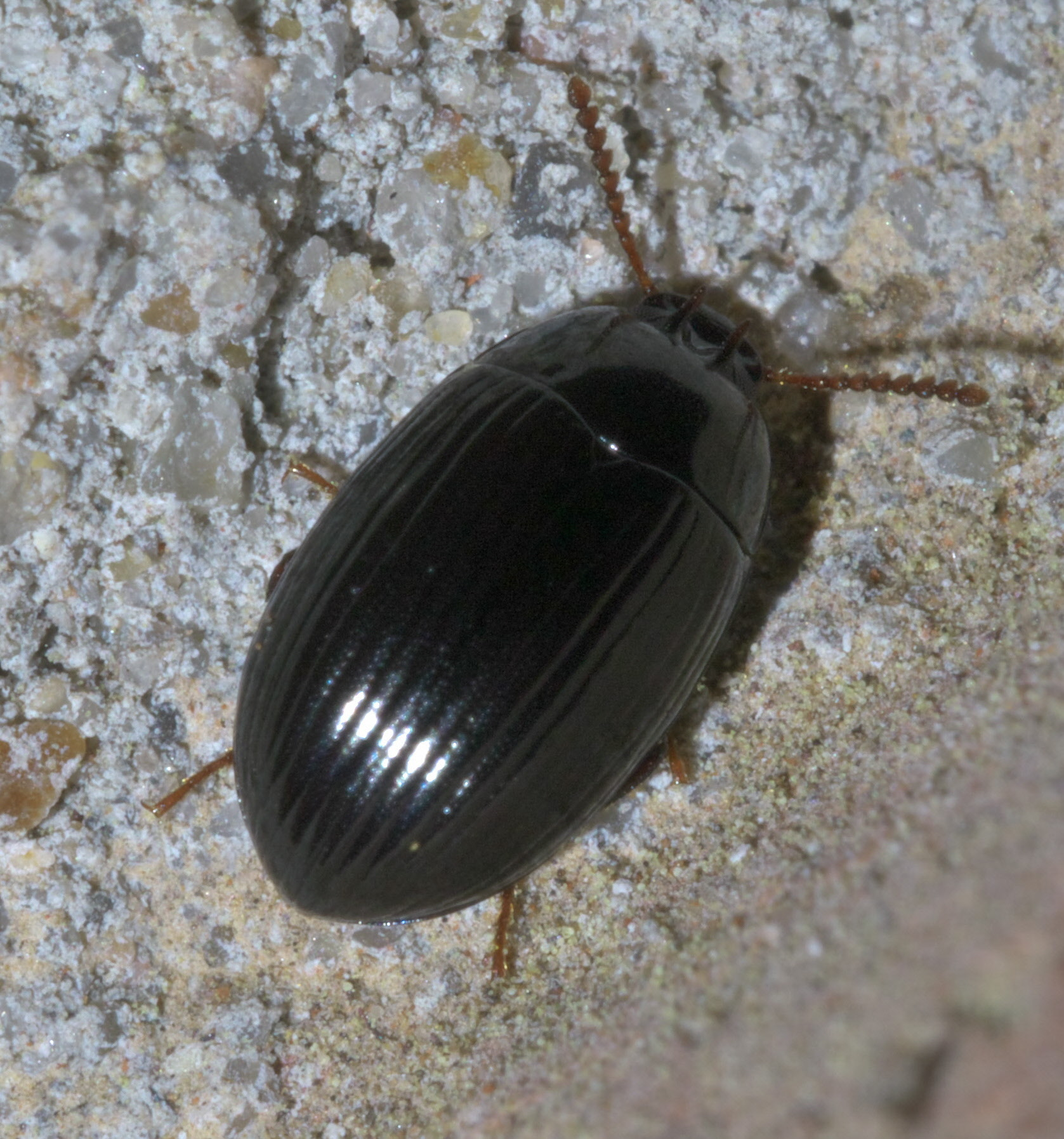
