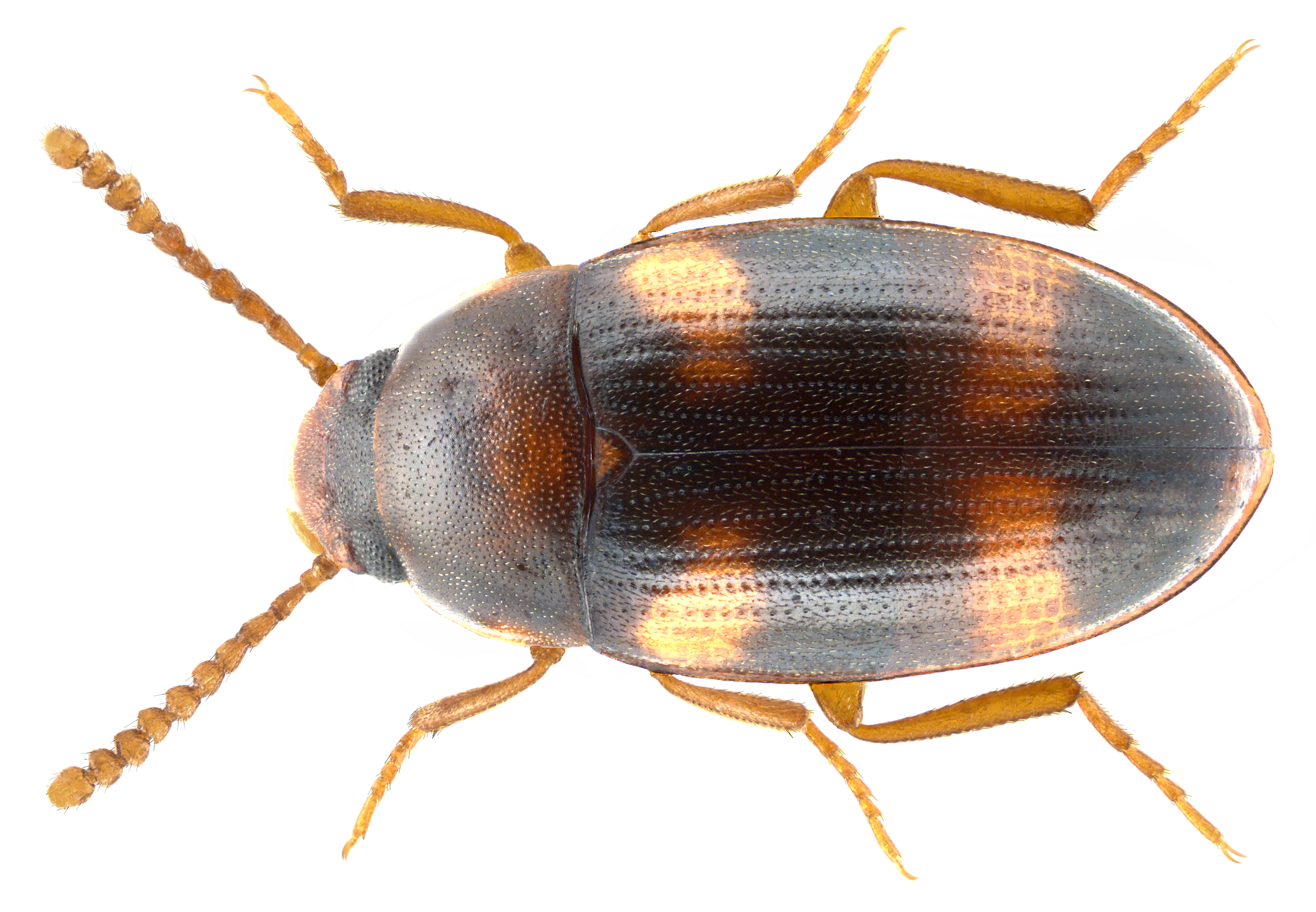

Scientific classification
- Domain: Eukaryota
- Kingdom: Animalia
- Phylum: Arthropoda
- Class: Insecta
- Order: Coleoptera
- Suborder: Polyphaga
- Infraorder: Cucujiformia
- Family: Tenebrionidae
- Genus: Alphitophagus
- Species: A. bifasciatus

Binomial name
- Alphitophagus bifasciatus (Say, 1824)

= Alphitophagus bifasciatus =

Species of beetle

Alphitophagus bifasciatus is a species of beetle belonging to the family Tenebrionidae.

It has almost cosmopolitan distribution.
