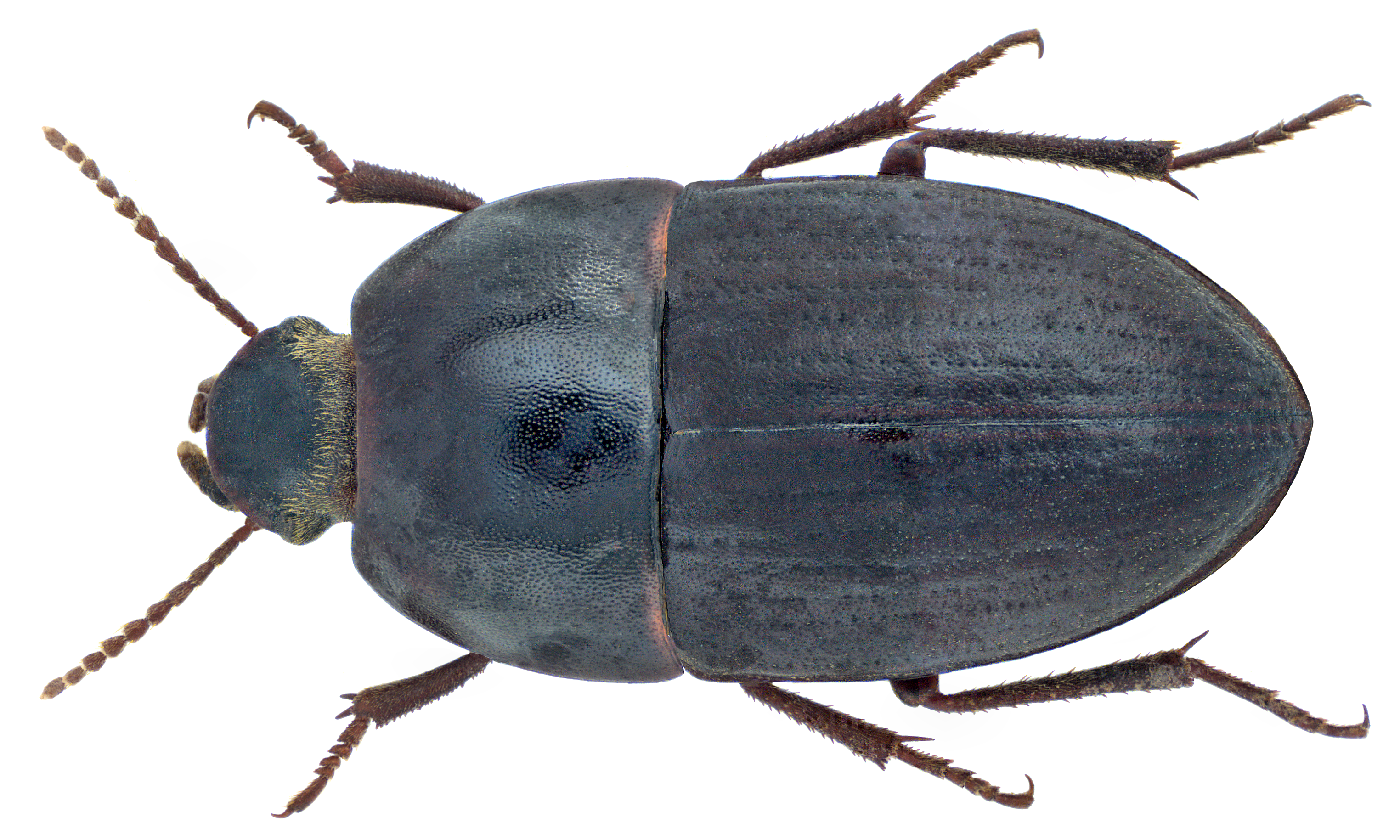

Scientific classification
- Kingdom: Animalia
- Phylum: Arthropoda
- Clade: Pancrustacea
- Class: Insecta
- Order: Coleoptera
- Suborder: Polyphaga
- Infraorder: Cucujiformia
- Family: Tenebrionidae
- Subfamily: Diaperinae
- Genus: Crypticus; Latreille, 1817

= Crypticus =

Genus of beetles

Crypticus is a genus of beetles belonging to the family Tenebrionidae.

Species:

- Crypticus corsosardous
- Crypticus gibbulus
- Crypticus mulsanti
- Crypticus quisquilius
- Crypticus richteri
