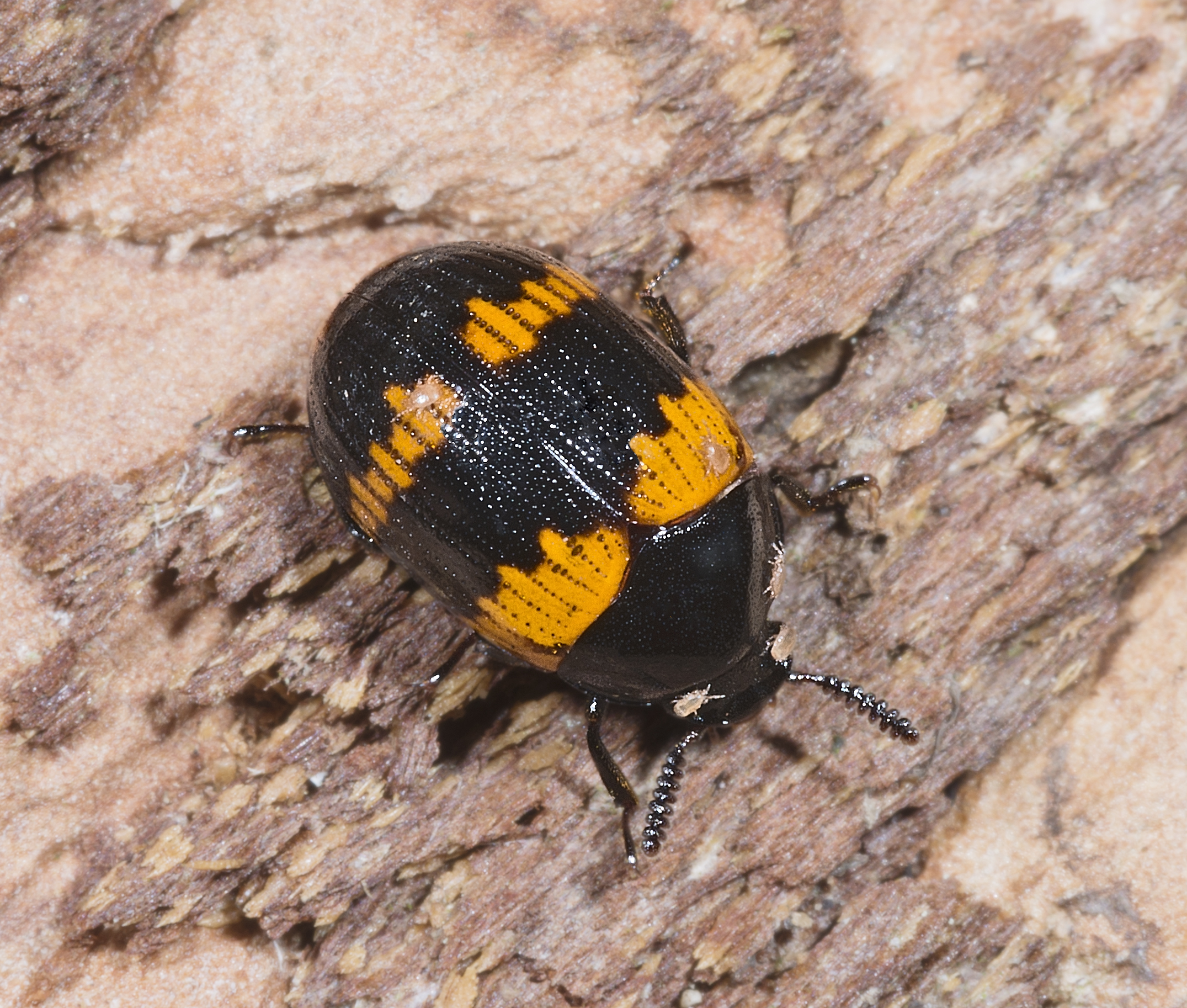
- Diaperis boleti

Scientific classification
- Kingdom: Animalia
- Phylum: Arthropoda
- Clade: Pancrustacea
- Class: Insecta
- Order: Coleoptera
- Suborder: Polyphaga
- Infraorder: Cucujiformia
- Family: Tenebrionidae
- Tribe: Diaperini
- Genus: Diaperis; Geoffroy, 1762

Type species
- Chrysomela boleti Linnaeus, 1758

= Diaperis =

Genus of beetles

Diaperis is a genus of darkling beetle with species known from Asia, Europe, and the Americas. Some species were formerly placed in the genus Allophasia. A species described in this genus is now Serrania viridula (Zayas, 1989).

Diaperis are broadly oval in shape and the dorsal surface is strongly convex. The elytra in most species (except D. coccinea, which is dorsally a uniform light brown) are boldly patterned with red/orange and black. The head is never armed with frontal horns, distinguishing Diaperis from related genus Neomida in which males have frontal horns.

Species in the genus include:

- Diaperis bifida Triplehorn and Brendell, 1985 - Brazil
- Diaperis boleti (Linnaeus, 1758)
  - Diaperis boleti bipustulata Laporte & Brullé, 1831
- Diaperis californica Blaisdell, 1929
- Diaperis lewisi Bates, 1873
  - Diaperis lewisi intersecta Gebien, 1913
- Diaperis maculata Olivier 1791
- Diaperis nigronotata Pic 1926
- Diaperis niponensis Lewis, 1887
- Diaperis quadrimaculata Pic, 1926: 22 - China, Xizang (Tibet)
- Diaperis rufipes Horn, 1870
- Diaperis sanguinipennis Bates, 1873 - China (Yunnan)

To verify

- Diaperis coccinea Laporte de Castelnau, 1840
- Diaperis fryi (Pascoe)
- Diaperis marseuli (Bates)
