= Adelina plana =

Scientific classification
- Kingdom: Animalia
- Phylum: Arthropoda
- Class: Insecta
- Order: Coleoptera
- Suborder: Polyphaga
- Infraorder: Cucujiformia
- Family: Tenebrionidae
- Genus: Adelina
- Species: A. plana

Binomial name
- Adelina plana (Fabricius, 1801)

Species of beetle

Adelina plana is a species of darkling beetle in the family Tenebrionidae.
