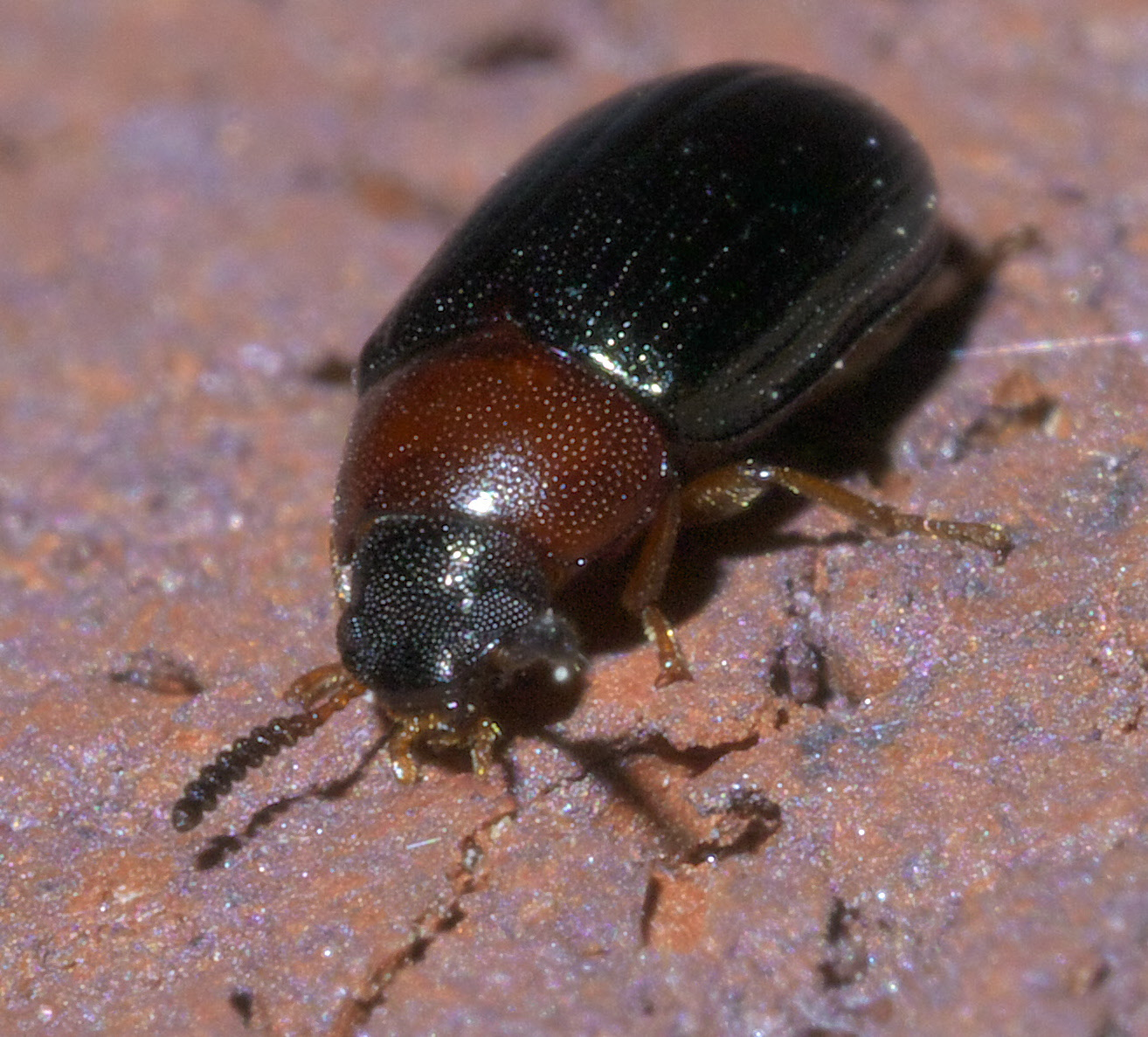

Scientific classification
- Kingdom: Animalia
- Phylum: Arthropoda
- Class: Insecta
- Order: Coleoptera
- Suborder: Polyphaga
- Infraorder: Cucujiformia
- Family: Tenebrionidae
- Genus: Neomida
- Species: N. bicornis

Binomial name
- Neomida bicornis (Fabricius, 1777)

= Neomida bicornis =

Species of beetle

Neomida bicornis is a species of darkling beetle in the family Tenebrionidae.

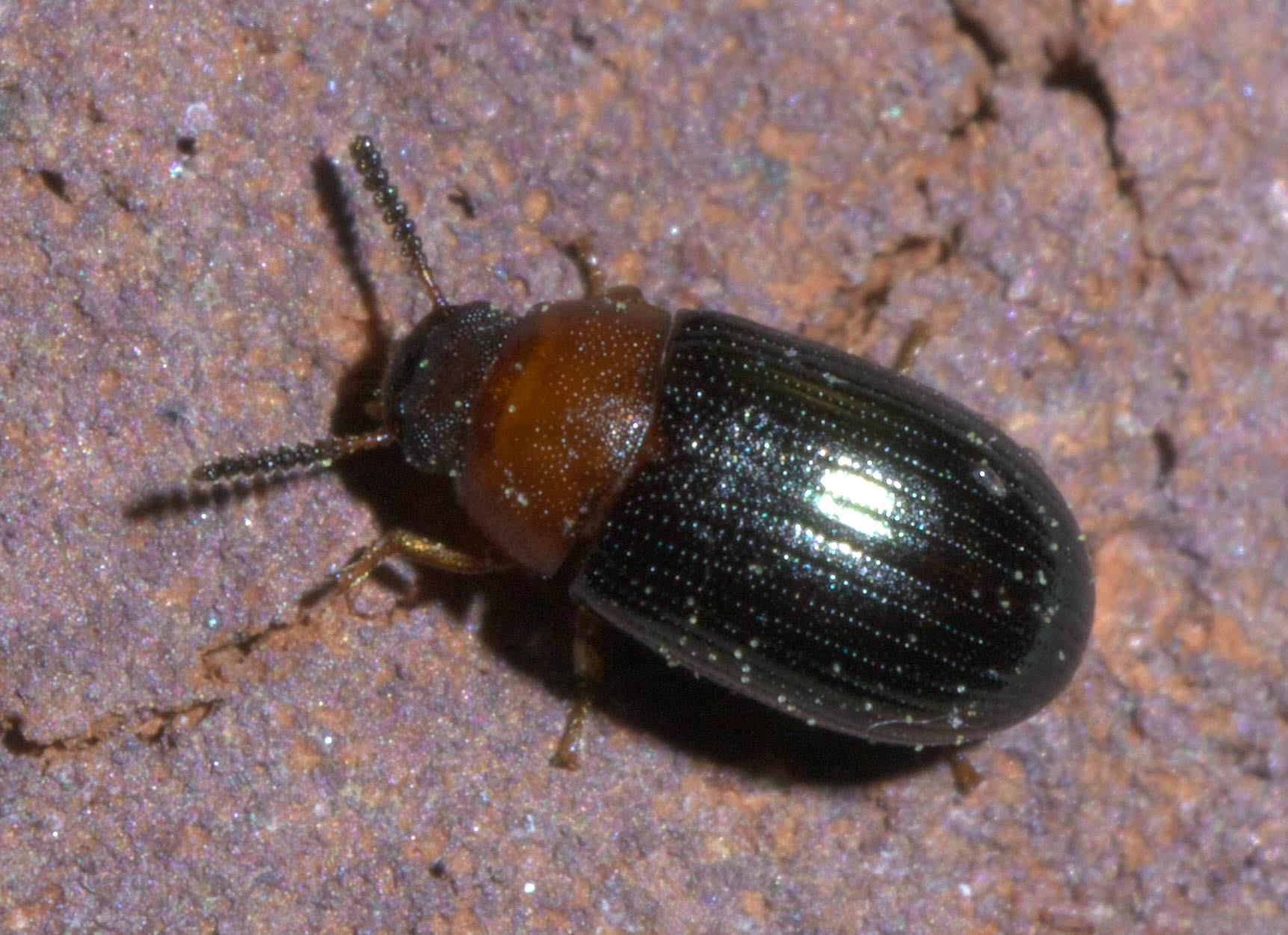

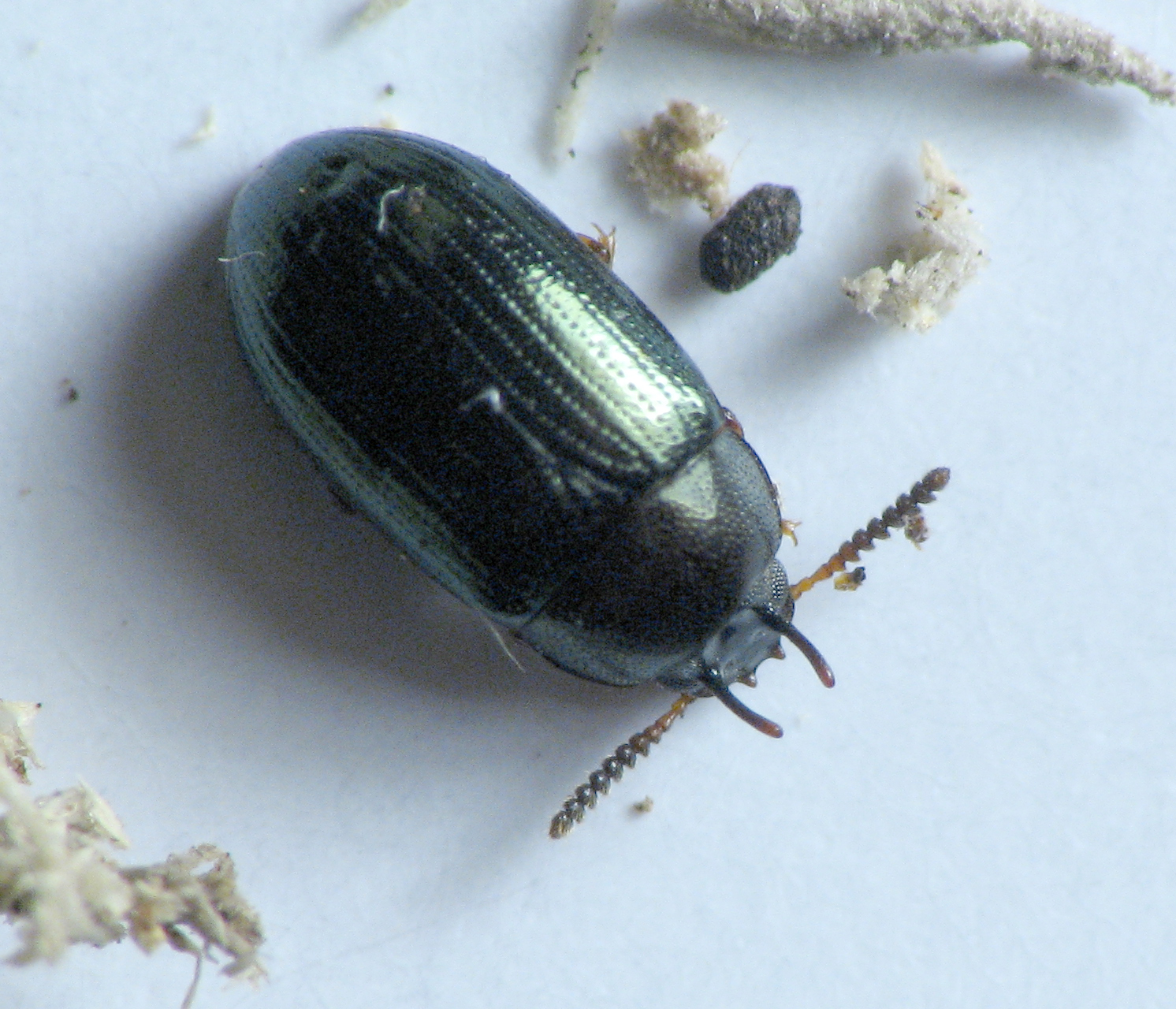
Male

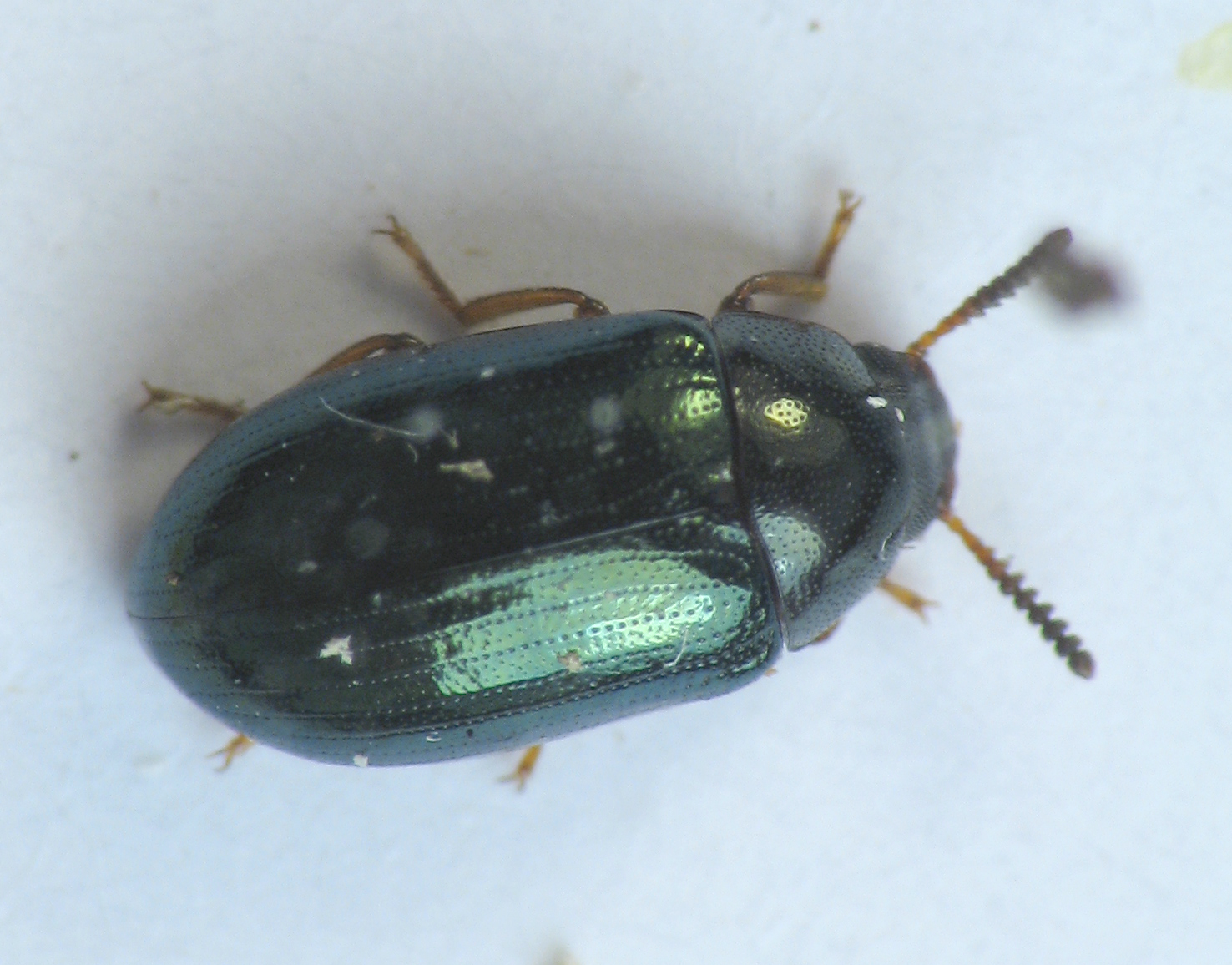
Female
