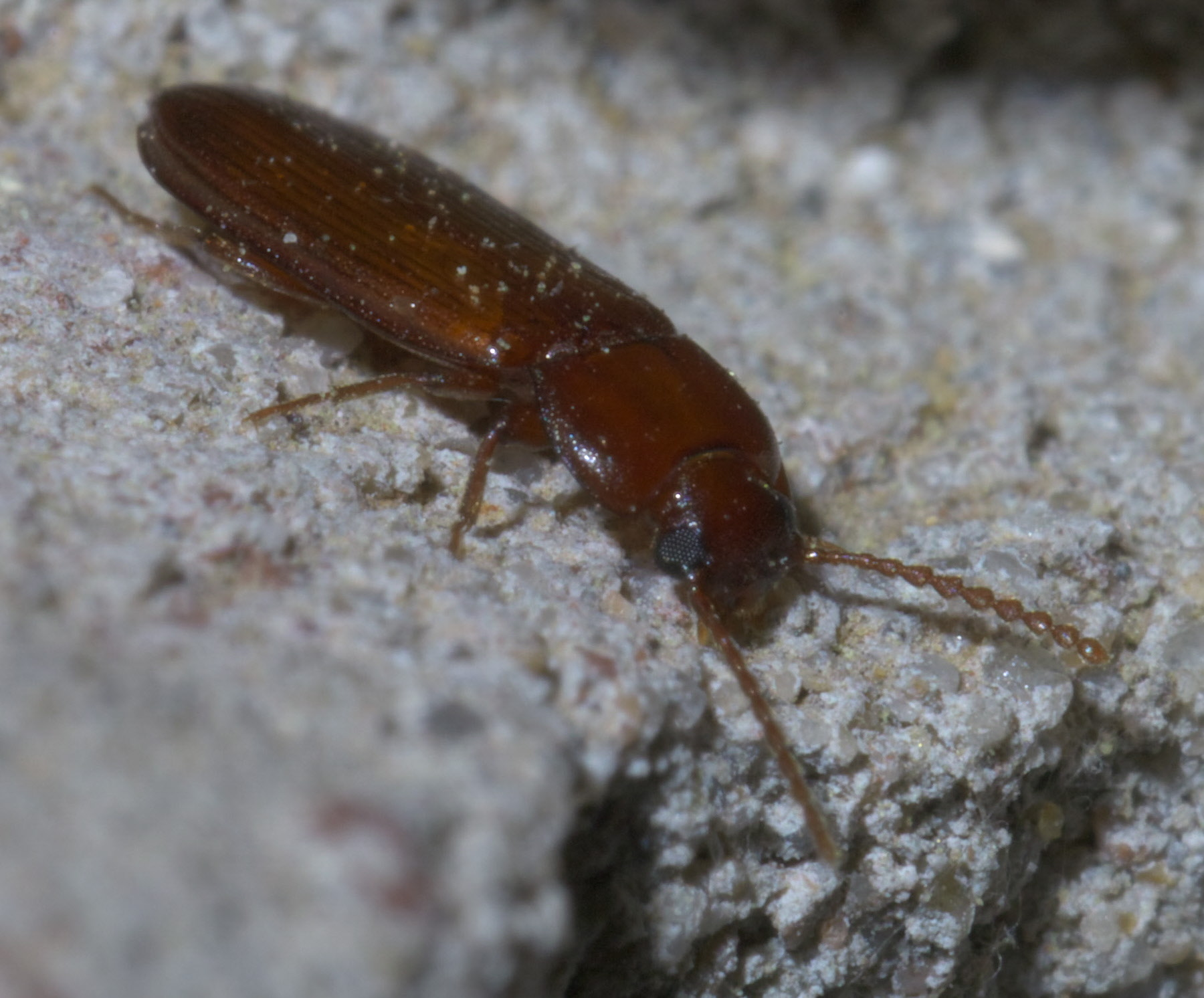

Scientific classification
- Kingdom: Animalia
- Phylum: Arthropoda
- Clade: Pancrustacea
- Class: Insecta
- Order: Coleoptera
- Suborder: Polyphaga
- Infraorder: Cucujiformia
- Family: Tenebrionidae
- Tribe: Diaperini
- Genus: Adelina; Dejean, 1835

= Adelina (beetle) =

Genus of beetles

Adelina is a genus of darkling beetles in the family Tenebrionidae. There are about seven described species in Adelina.

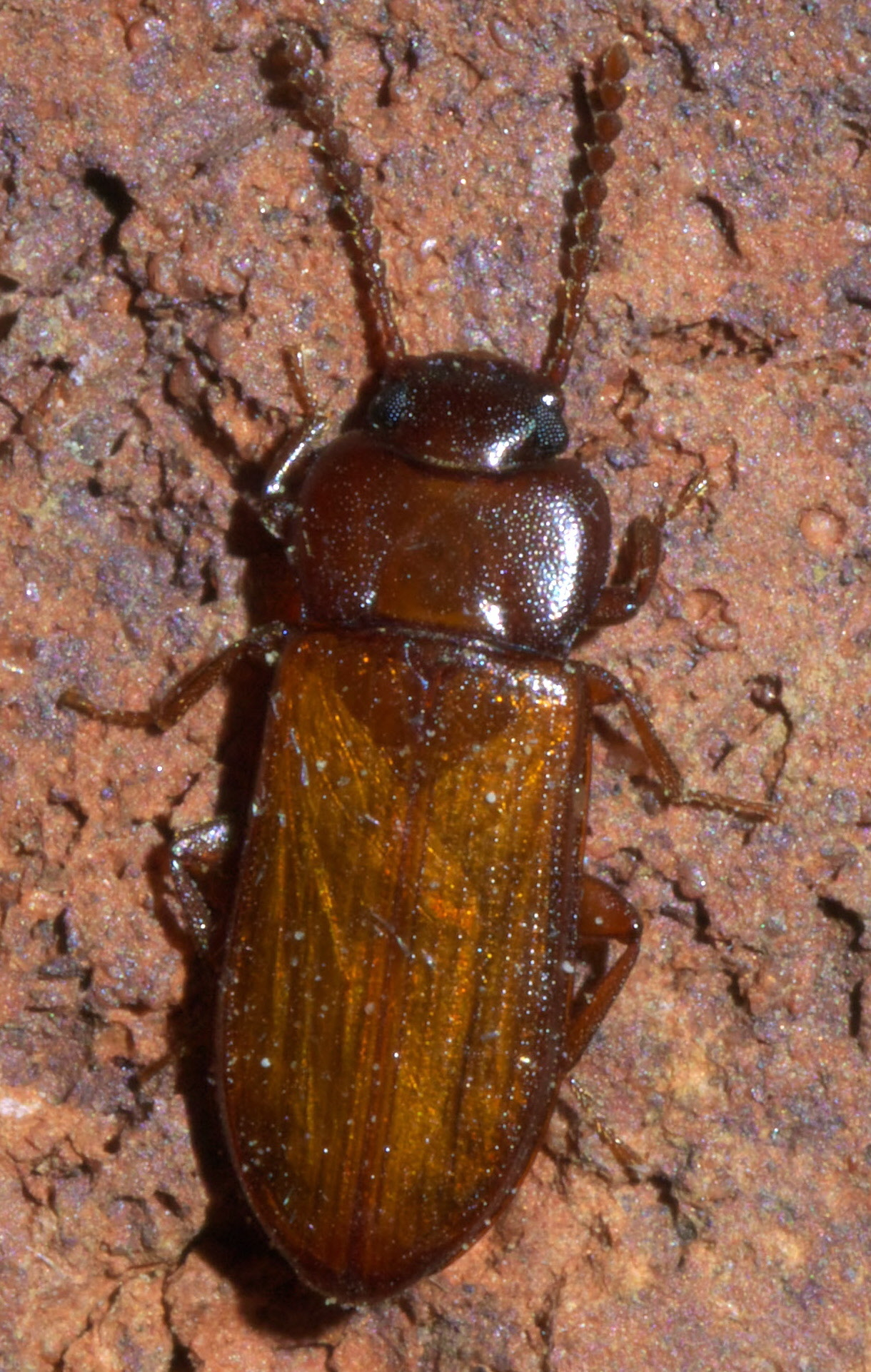

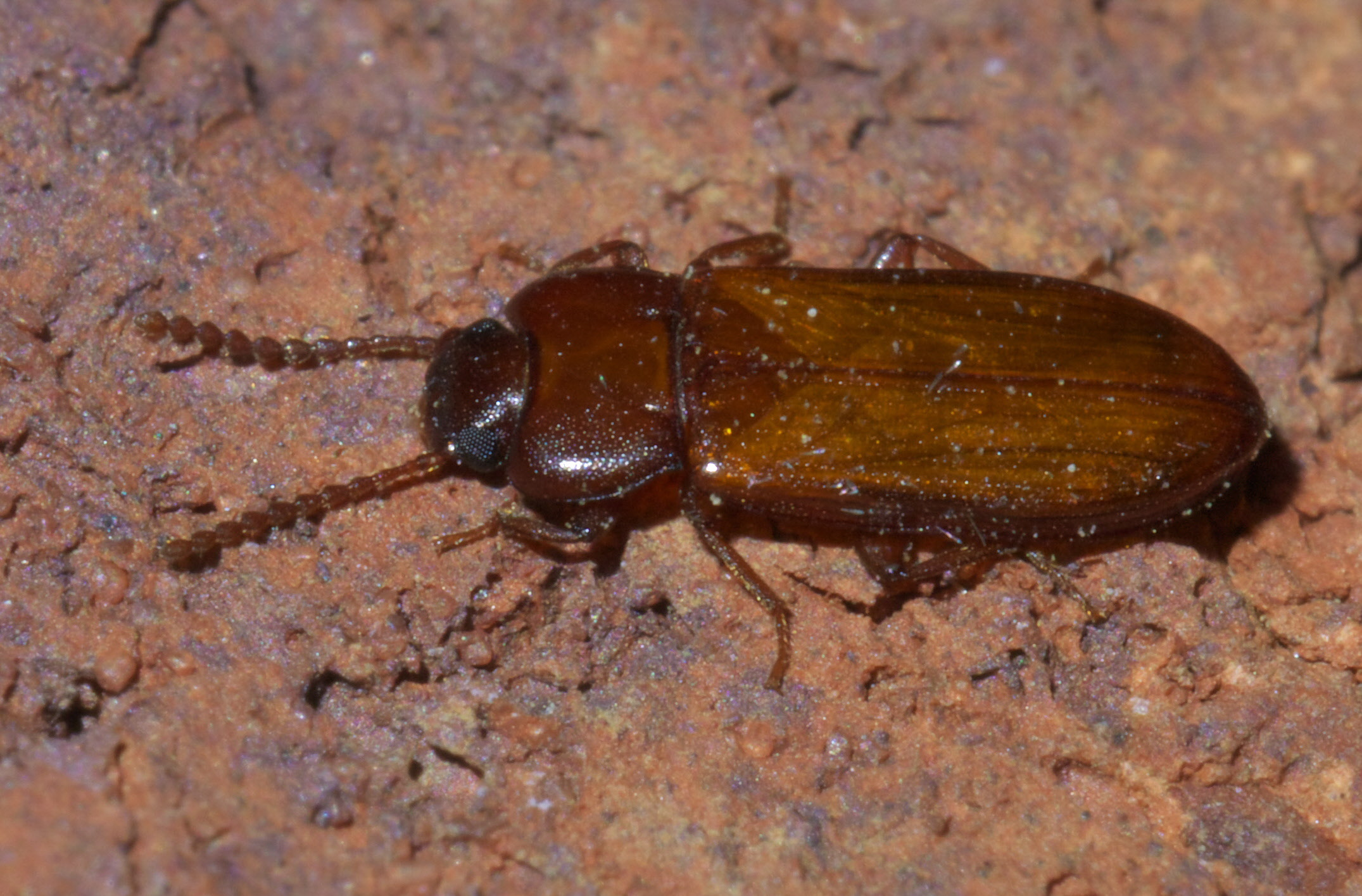

== Species ==
These seven species belong to the genus Adelina:

- Adelina bacardi^{g}
- Adelina bidens^{b}
- Adelina frontalis (Champion, 1886)^{g}
- Adelina pallida (Say)^{b}
- Adelina pici (Ardoin, 1977)^{g}
- Adelina plana (Fabricius, 1801)^{i c g b}
- Adelina subcornuta (Ardoin, 1977)^{g}

Data sources: i = ITIS, c = Catalogue of Life, g = GBIF, b = Bugguide.net
