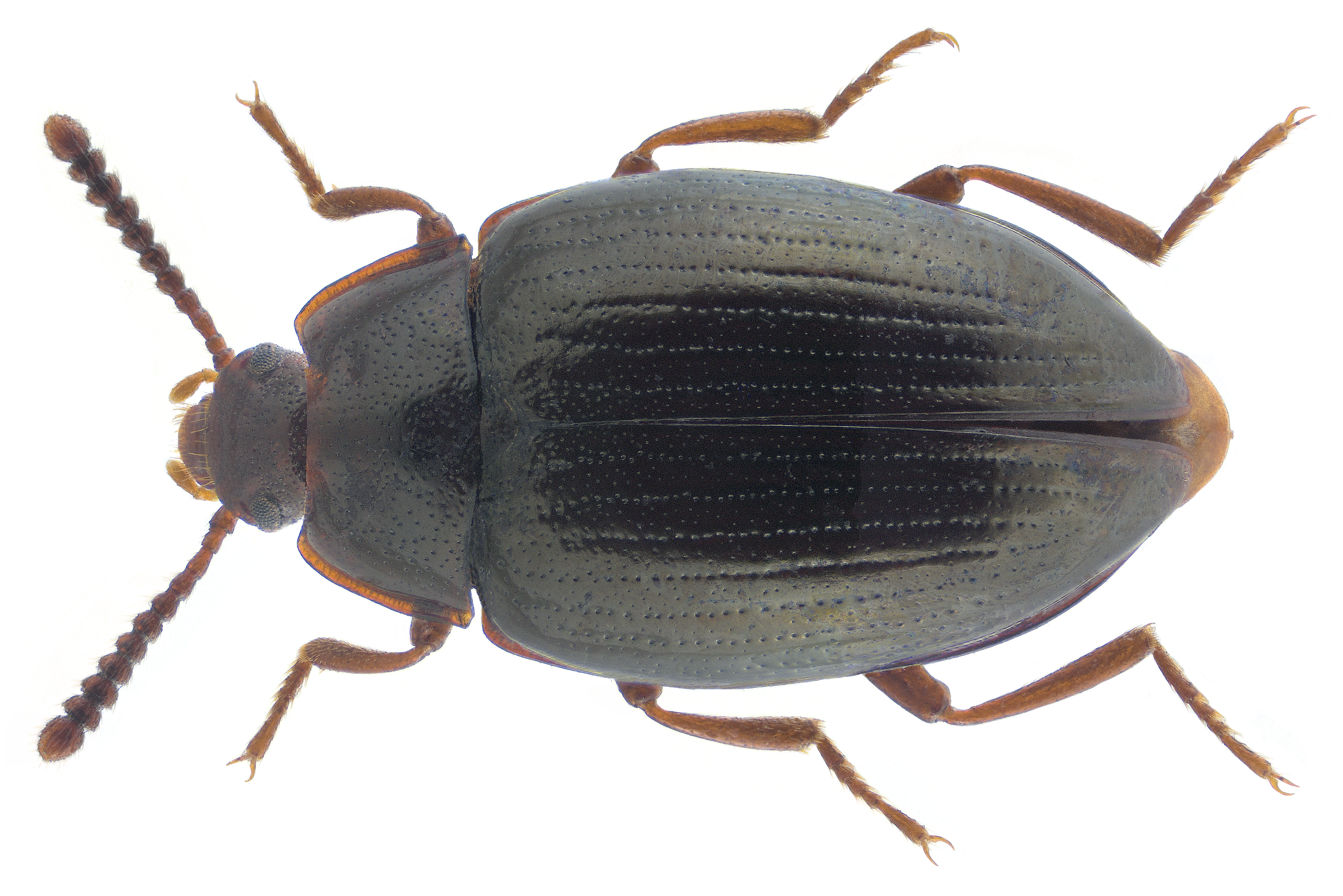
- Scaphidema metallicum

Scientific classification
- Domain: Eukaryota
- Kingdom: Animalia
- Phylum: Arthropoda
- Class: Insecta
- Order: Coleoptera
- Suborder: Polyphaga
- Infraorder: Cucujiformia
- Family: Tenebrionidae
- Genus: Scaphidema; Redtenbacher, 1848

= Scaphidema =

Genus of beetles

Scaphidema is a genus of beetles belonging to the family Tenebrionidae.

The species of this genus are found in Europe, Japan and Northern America.

Species:

- Scaphidema aeneola (LeConte, 1850)
- Scaphidema formosanum Masumoto, 1982
