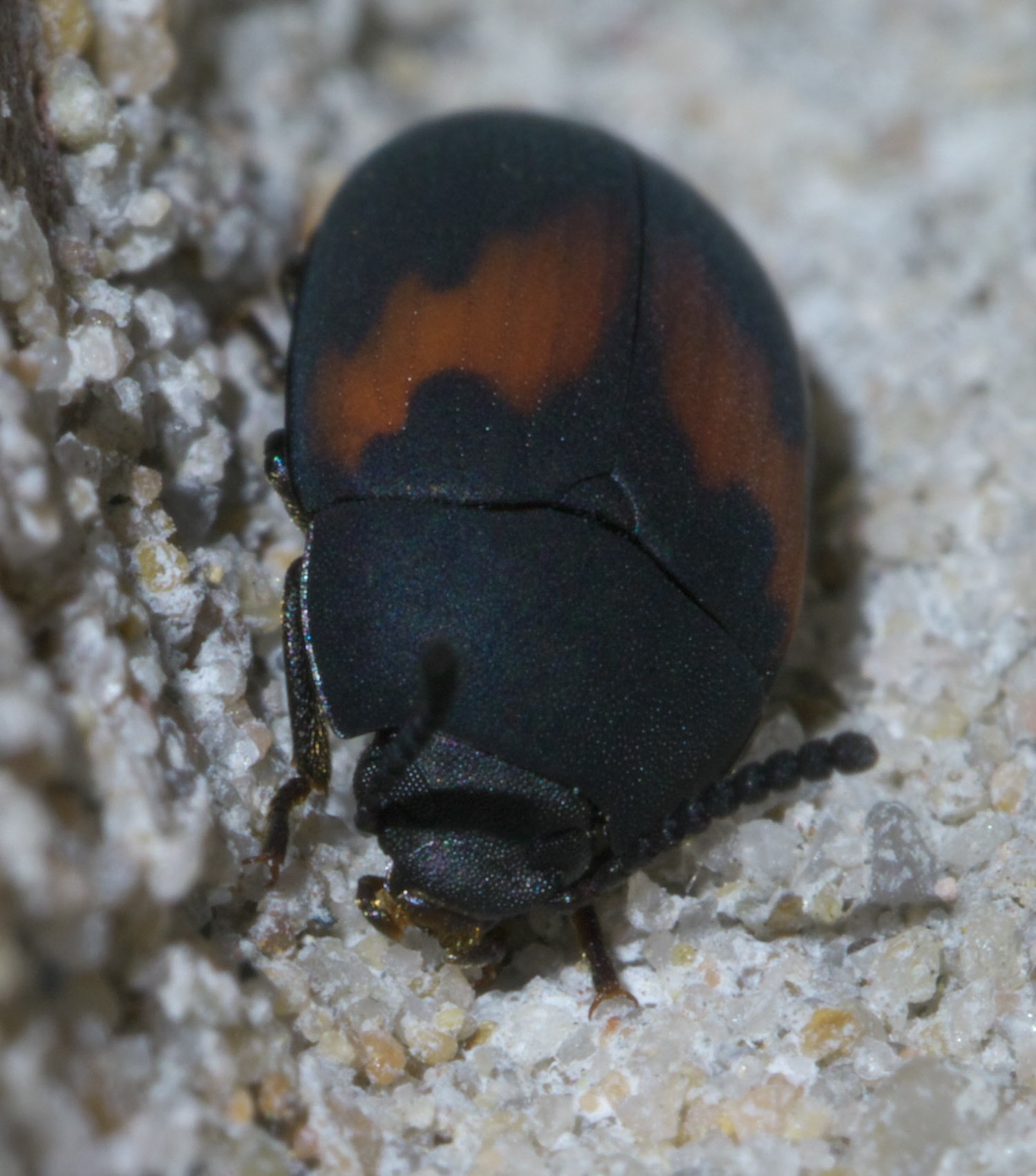
- Platydema ellipticum

Scientific classification
- Kingdom: Animalia
- Phylum: Arthropoda
- Class: Insecta
- Order: Coleoptera
- Suborder: Polyphaga
- Infraorder: Cucujiformia
- Family: Tenebrionidae
- Tribe: Diaperini
- Genus: Platydema; Laporte & Brullé, 1831

= Platydema =

Genus of beetles

Platydema is a genus of darkling beetles in the family Tenebrionidae. There are at least 60 described species in Platydema.

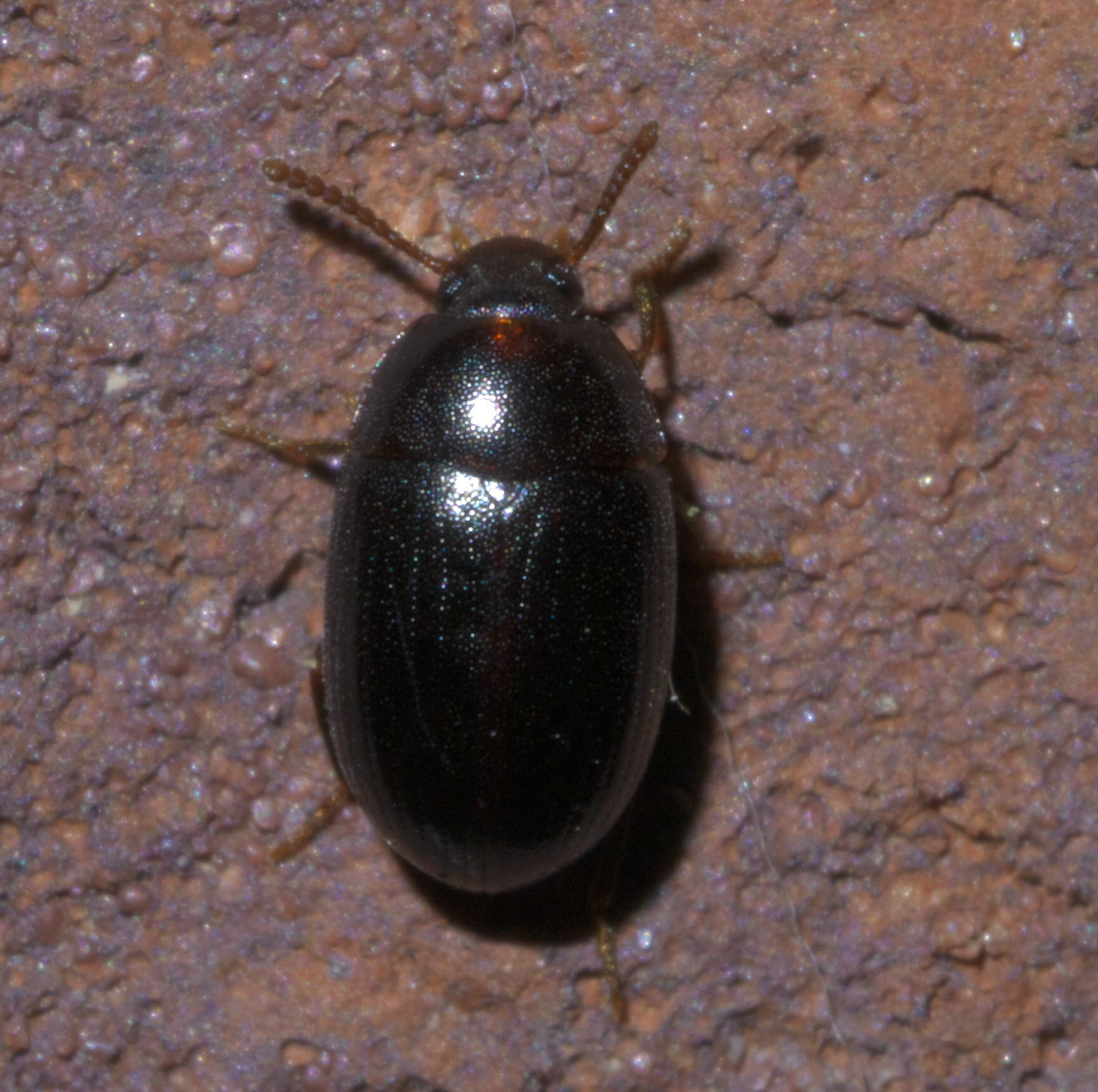
Platydema subcostatum

== Species ==
These 67 species belong to the genus Platydema:

- Platydema alticorne Gravely, 1915^{g}
- Platydema americanum Laporte & Brullé, 1831^{g b}
- Platydema aurimaculatum Gravely, 1915^{g}
- Platydema bimaculatum Champion, 1886^{g}
- Platydema coeruleum Gebien, 1925^{g}
- Platydema cruentum (Perty, 1830)^{g}
- Platydema cruentatum Laporte de Castelnau & Brullé, 1831^{g}
- Platydema dejeanii Laporte de Castelnau & Brullé, 1831^{g}
- Platydema ellipticum (Fabricius, 1798)^{g b}
- Platydema endoi Masumoto, 1984^{g}
- Platydema erythrocera^{b}
- Platydema europaeum Laporte de Castelnau & Brullé, 1831^{g}
- Platydema excavatum (Say, 1824)^{g b}
- Platydema flavipes (Fabricius, 1801)^{b}
- Platydema flavopictum Gebien, 1913^{g}
- Platydema fumosum^{g}
- Platydema guatemalense Champion, 1886^{g}
- Platydema haemorrhoidale Gebien, 1913^{g}
- Platydema inquilinum^{b}
- Platydema irradians (Chevrolat, 1877)^{g}
- Platydema laevipes Haldeman, 1848^{b}
- Platydema lebomicum Schawaller, 2004^{g}
- Platydema marseuli Lewis, 1894^{g}
- Platydema micans Horn, 1870^{b}
- Platydema monoceros Gebien, 1925^{g}
- Platydema neglectum Triplehorn, 1965^{g}
- Platydema nigratum^{b}
- Platydema nigricorne Laporte de Castelnau & Brullé, 1831^{g}
- Platydema nigrifrons Chevrolat, 1878^{g}
- Platydema notatum Laporte de Castelnau & Brullé, 1831^{g}
- Platydema obscurum Sharp, 1885^{i c g}
- Platydema oregonense LeConte, 1857^{g b}
- Platydema pallidicolle (Lewis, 1894)^{g}
- Platydema parachalceum Masumoto, 1982^{g}
- Platydema picilabrum Melsheimer, 1846^{b}
- Platydema picipes Laporte de Castelnau & Brullé, 1831^{g}
- Platydema pictum (Fauvel, 1904)^{g}
- Platydema quindecimmaculatum Chevrolat, 1878^{g}
- Platydema raharizoninai Ardoin, 1966^{g}
- Platydema rubropictum Chevrolat, 1878^{g}
- Platydema ruficolle^{b}
- Platydema ruficorne (Sturm, 1826)^{g b}
- Platydema sakishimense Nakane, 1973^{g}
- Platydema sauteri Gebien, 1913^{g}
- Platydema sawadai Masumoto, 1991^{g}
- Platydema sexmaculatum Chevrolat, 1878^{g}
- Platydema sexnotatum^{b}
- Platydema silphoides Laporte de Castelnau & Brullé, 1831^{g}
- Platydema striatum (Montrouzier, 1860)^{g}
- Platydema subcostatum Laporte & Brullé, 1831^{g b}
- Platydema subfasciatum (Walker, 1858)^{g}
- Platydema sulcipenne Gebien, 1925^{g}
- Platydema tahitiense Kaszab, 1985^{g}
- Platydema takeii Nakane, 1956^{g}
- Platydema teleops Triplehorn, 1965^{g b}
- Platydema terusane Masumoto, 1984^{g}
- Platydema tibiale Chevrolat, 1878^{g}
- Platydema toyamai Masumoto & al., 2013^{g}
- Platydema transversum Laporte de Castelnau & Brullé, 1831^{g}
- Platydema triste Laporte de Castelnau & Brulle, 1831^{g}
- Platydema tuchinlonoi Masumoto, 1982^{g}
- Platydema varians Laporte de Castelnau & Brullé, 1831^{g}
- Platydema violaceum (Fabricius, 1790)^{g}
- Platydema wandae Triplehorn, 1965^{b}
- Platydema yangmingense Masumoto, 1982^{g}

Data sources: i = ITIS, c = Catalogue of Life, g = GBIF, b = Bugguide.net
