= Myrmecomelix =

Scientific classification
- Kingdom: Animalia
- Phylum: Arthropoda
- Subphylum: Chelicerata
- Class: Arachnida
- Order: Araneae
- Infraorder: Araneomorphae
- Family: Linyphiidae
- Genus: Myrmecomelix; Millidge, 1993

Type species
- M. pulcher (Millidge, 1991)

Species
- 2, see text

Genus of spiders

Myrmecomelix is a genus of South American dwarf spiders that was first described by Norman I. Platnick in 1993.

== Species ==
As of May 2019 it contains two species:

- Myrmecomelix leucippus Miller, 2007 – Peru
- Myrmecomelix pulcher (Millidge, 1991) (type) – Ecuador, Peru
