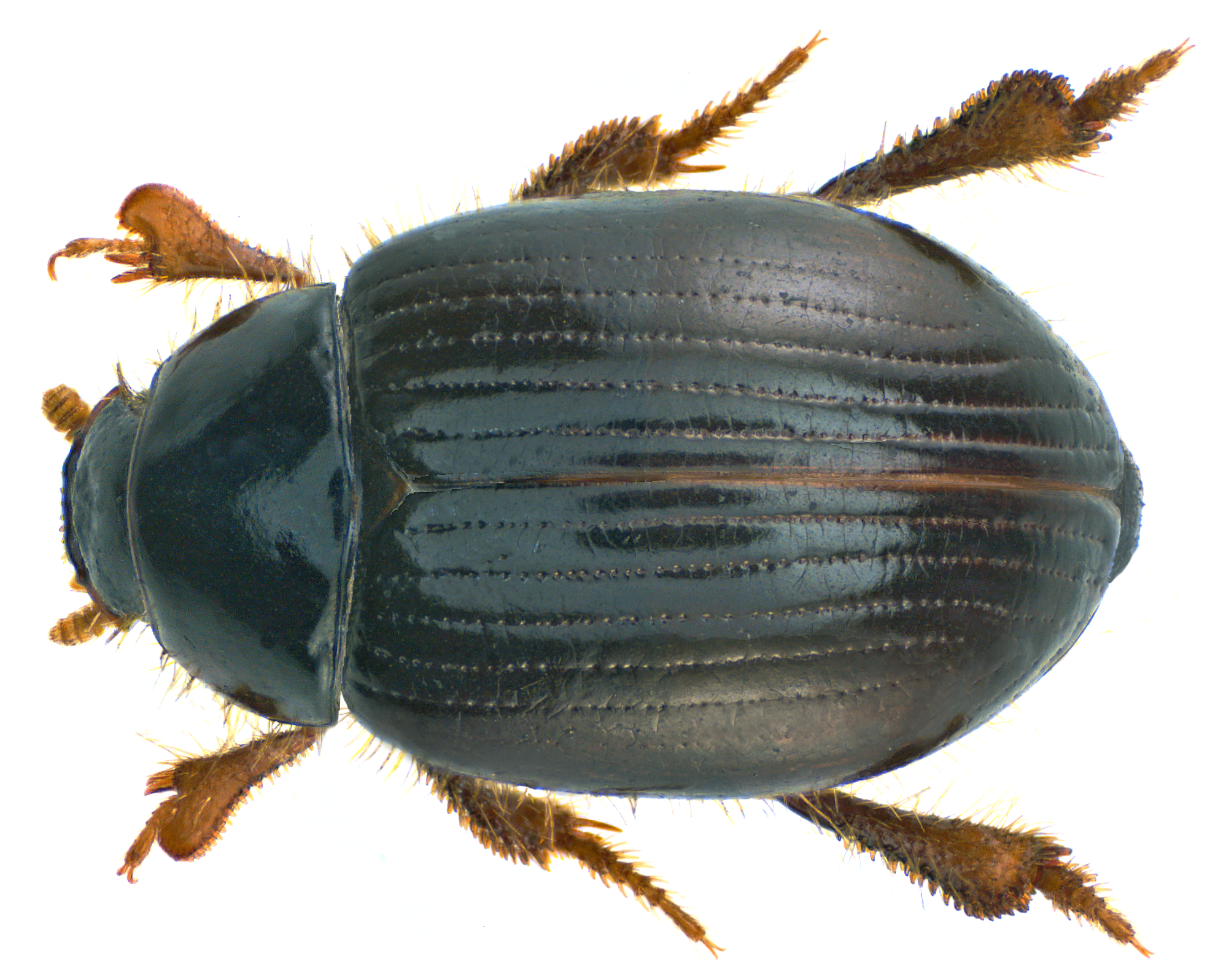
- Trachyscelis aphodioides

Scientific classification
- Kingdom: Animalia
- Phylum: Arthropoda
- Class: Insecta
- Order: Coleoptera
- Suborder: Polyphaga
- Infraorder: Cucujiformia
- Family: Tenebrionidae
- Tribe: Trachyscelini
- Genus: Trachyscelis; Latreille, 1809

= Trachyscelis =

Genus of beetles

Trachyscelis is a genus of darkling beetles in the family Tenebrionidae. There are at least two described species in Trachyscelis.

== Species ==
These two species belong to the genus Trachyscelis:

- Trachyscelis aphodioides Latreille, 1809^{g b}
- Trachyscelis chinensis Champion, 1894^{g}

Data sources: i = ITIS, c = Catalogue of Life, g = GBIF, b = Bugguide.net
