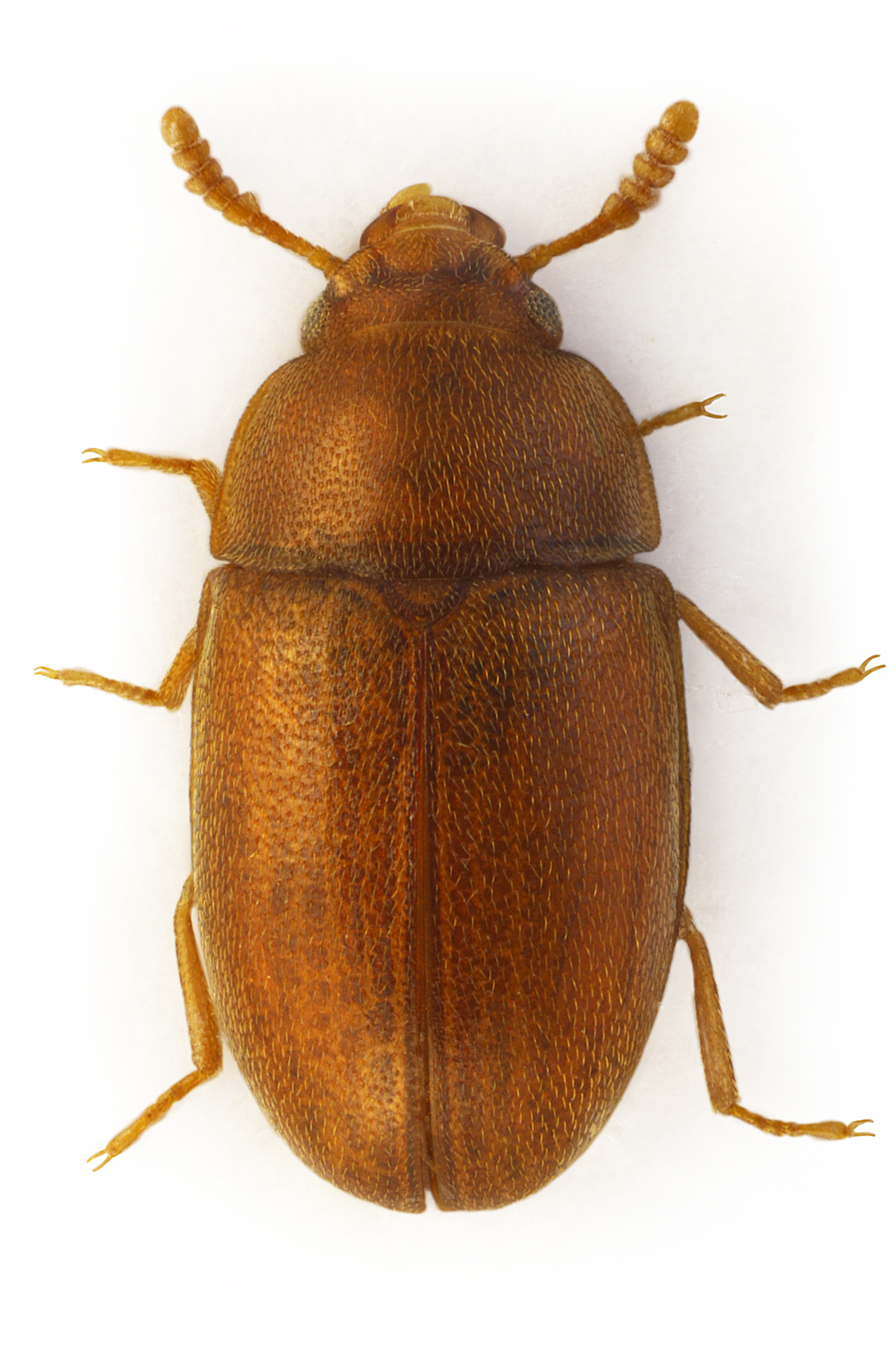
- Pentaphyllus testaceus

Scientific classification
- Kingdom: Animalia
- Phylum: Arthropoda
- Clade: Pancrustacea
- Class: Insecta
- Order: Coleoptera
- Suborder: Polyphaga
- Infraorder: Cucujiformia
- Family: Tenebrionidae
- Tribe: Diaperini
- Genus: Pentaphyllus; Dejean, 1821

= Pentaphyllus =

Genus of beetles

Pentaphyllus is a genus of darkling beetles in the family Tenebrionidae. There are about six described species in Pentaphyllus.

== Species ==
These six species belong to the genus Pentaphyllus:

- Pentaphyllus californicus^{b}
- Pentaphyllus chrysomeloides (Rossi, 1792)^{g}
- Pentaphyllus ensifera (Fauvel, 1904)^{g}
- Pentaphyllus pallidus LeConte^{g b}
- Pentaphyllus quadricornis Gebien, 1914^{g}
- Pentaphyllus testaceus (Hellwig, 1792)^{g b}

Data sources: i = ITIS, c = Catalogue of Life, g = GBIF, b = Bugguide.net
