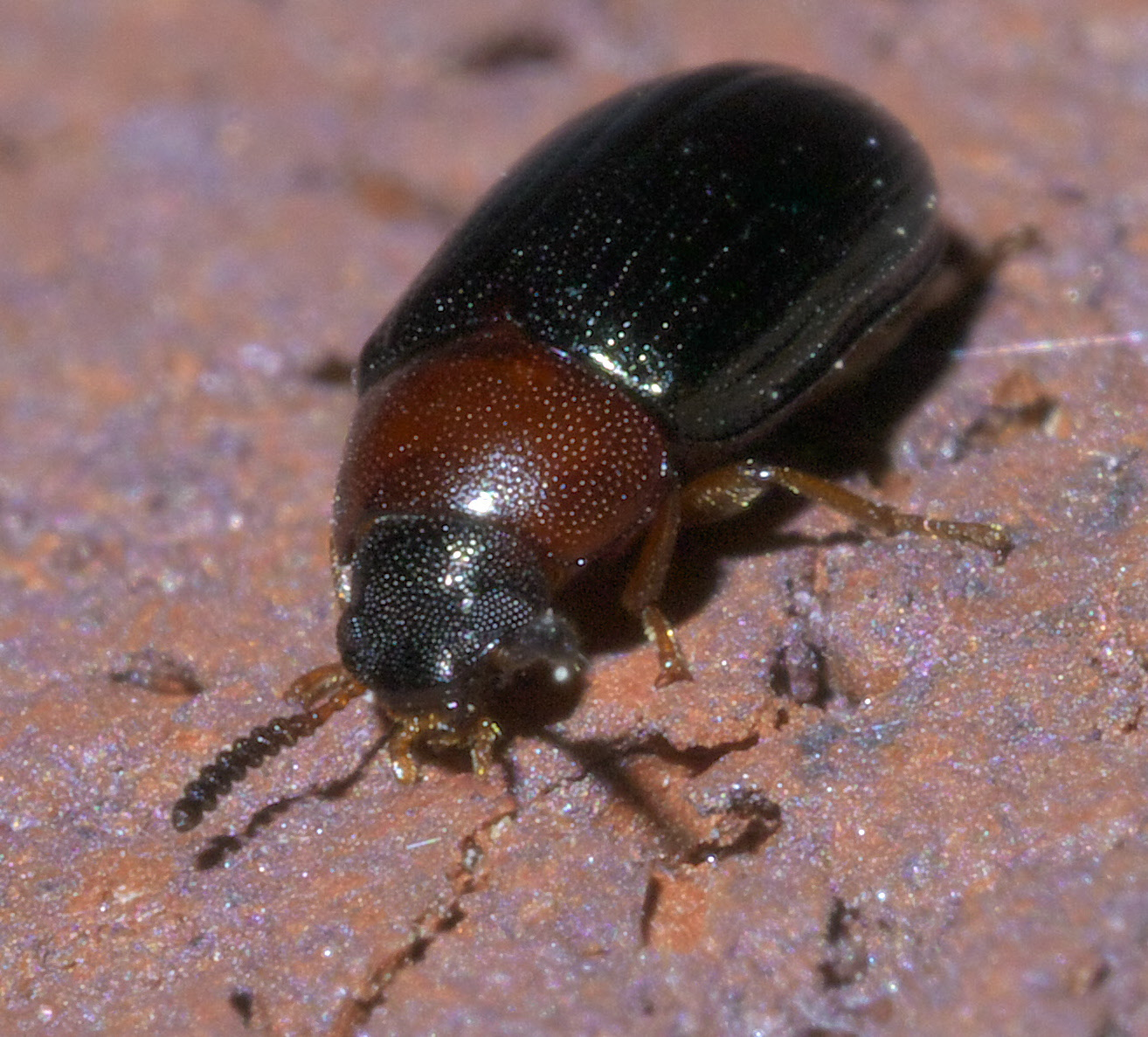
- Neomida bicornis

Scientific classification
- Kingdom: Animalia
- Phylum: Arthropoda
- Clade: Pancrustacea
- Class: Insecta
- Order: Coleoptera
- Suborder: Polyphaga
- Infraorder: Cucujiformia
- Family: Tenebrionidae
- Tribe: Diaperini
- Genus: Neomida; Latreille, 1829

= Neomida =

Genus of beetles

Neomida is a genus of darkling beetles in the family Tenebrionidae. There are about 18 described species in Neomida.

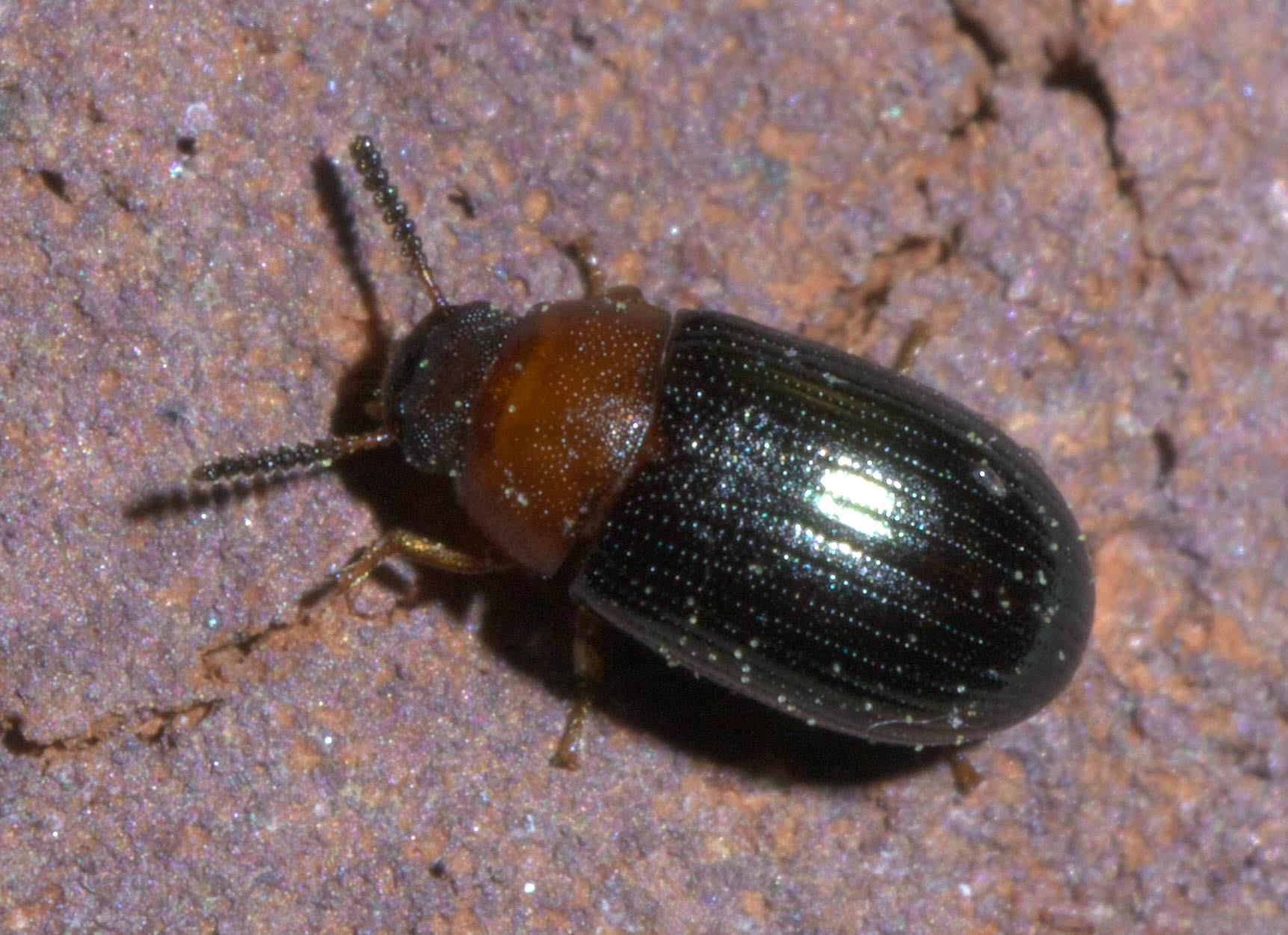
Neomida bicornis

== Species ==
These 18 species belong to the genus Neomida:

- Neomida armata (Laporte de Castelnau & Brullé, 1831)^{g}
- Neomida atricollis (Pic, 1926)^{g}
- Neomida bicornis (Fabricius, 1777)^{g b}
- Neomida bituberculata Olivier, 1791^{g}
- Neomida castanea (Bates, 1873)^{g}
- Neomida convexa Pic, 1926^{g}
- Neomida deltocera Triplehorn, 1994^{g}
- Neomida ferruginea^{b}
- Neomida haemorrhoidalis (Fabricius, 1787)^{g}
- Neomida hoffmannseggi (Laporte de Castelnau & Brullé, 1831)^{g}
- Neomida inermis Champion, 1886^{g}
- Neomida lecontii (Bates, 1873)^{g}
- Neomida luteonotata (Pic, 1926)^{g}
- Neomida minuta (Pic, 1926)^{g}
- Neomida picea (Laporte de Castelnau & Brullé, 1831)^{g}
- Neomida pogonocera Triplehorn, 1994^{g}
- Neomida suilla (Champion, 1896)^{g}
- Neomida vitula (Chevrolat, 1878)^{g}

Data sources: i = ITIS, c = Catalogue of Life, g = GBIF, b = Bugguide.net
