= Cynaeus =

Scientific classification
- Kingdom: Animalia
- Phylum: Arthropoda
- Clade: Pancrustacea
- Class: Insecta
- Order: Coleoptera
- Suborder: Polyphaga
- Infraorder: Cucujiformia
- Family: Tenebrionidae
- Genus: Cynaeus; LeConte, 1862

Genus of beetles

Cynaeus is a genus of beetles belonging to the family Tenebrionidae.

The species of this genus are found in Europe and North America. Species:

- Cynaeus angustus (LeConte, 1851)'
