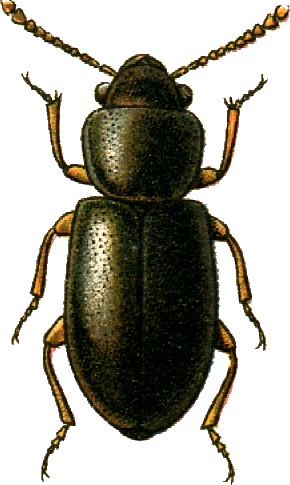

Scientific classification
- Kingdom: Animalia
- Phylum: Arthropoda
- Class: Insecta
- Order: Coleoptera
- Suborder: Polyphaga
- Infraorder: Cucujiformia
- Family: Tenebrionidae
- Genus: Myrmechixenus; Chevrolat, 1835

= Myrmechixenus =

Genus of beetles

Myrmechixenus is a genus of beetles belonging to the family Tenebrionidae.

The species of this genus are found in Europe and Northern America.

== Species ==
- Myrmechixenus lathridioides Crotch, 1873
- Myrmechixenus picinus (Aubé, 1850)
