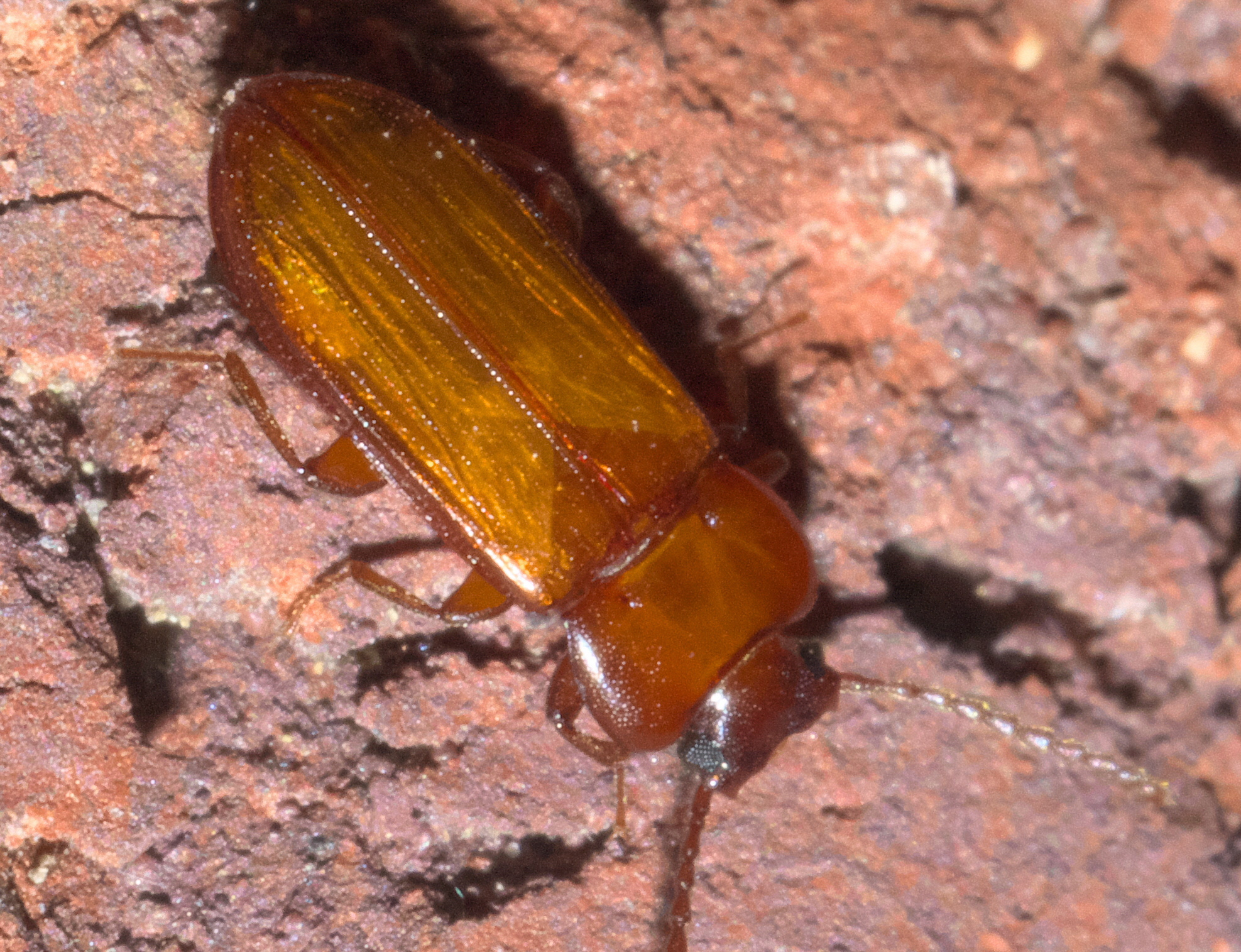
- Adelina

Scientific classification
- Kingdom: Animalia
- Phylum: Arthropoda
- Class: Insecta
- Order: Coleoptera
- Suborder: Polyphaga
- Infraorder: Cucujiformia
- Family: Tenebrionidae
- Subfamily: Diaperinae; Latreille, 1802

Tribes
- Crypticini Brullé, 1832; Diaperini Latreille, 1802; Ectychini Doyen, Matthews & Lawrence, 1990; Gnathidiini Gebien, 1921; Hyociini G.S. Medvedev & Lawrence, 1982; Hypophlaeini Billberg, 1820; Leiochrinini Lewis, 1894; Myrmechixenini Jacquelin du Val, 1858; Phaleriini Blanchard, 1845; Scaphidemini Reitter, 1922; Trachyscelini Blanchard, 1845

Diversity
- at least 120 genera

= Diaperinae =

Subfamily of beetles

Diaperinae is a subfamily of darkling beetles in the family Tenebrionidae. There are more than 120 genera in Diaperinae, grouped into 11 tribes.

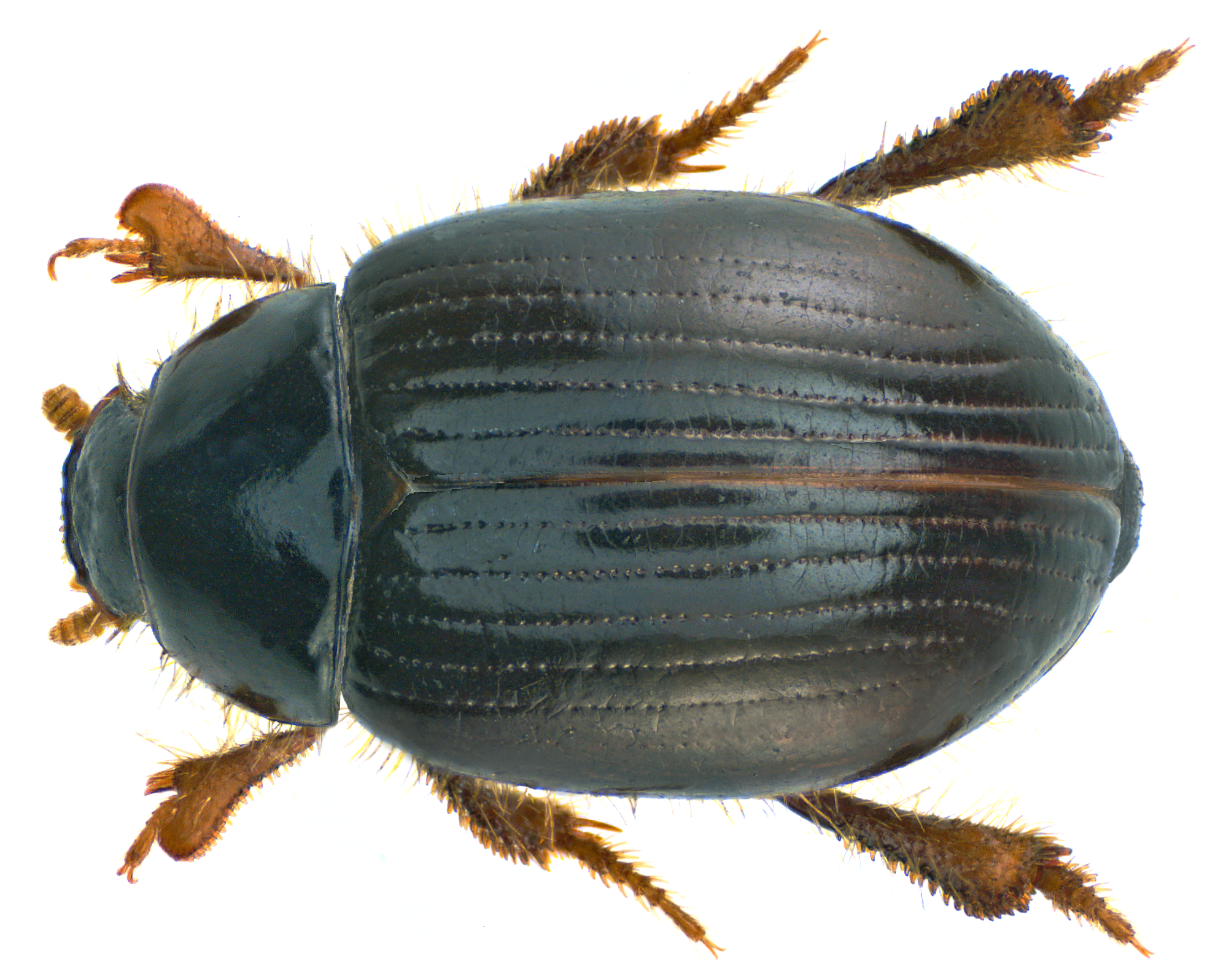
Trachyscelis aphodioides

== See also ==
- List of Diaperinae genera
