= List of beetle species recorded in Great Britain – superfamily Tenebrionoidea =

The following is a list of beetle species of the superfamily Tenebrionoidea recorded in Great Britain. For other beetles, see List of beetle species recorded in Britain.

== Family Mycetophagidae ==
- Pseudotriphyllus suturalis (Fabricius, 1801)
- Triphyllus bicolor (Fabricius, 1777)
- Litargus balteatus LeConte, 1856
- Litargus connexus (Geoffroy in Fourcroy, 1785)
- Mycetophagus atomarius (Fabricius, 1787)
- Mycetophagus fulvicollis Fabricius, 1793
- Mycetophagus multipunctatus Fabricius, 1793
- Mycetophagus piceus (Fabricius, 1777)
- Mycetophagus populi Fabricius, 1798
- Mycetophagus quadriguttatus P. W. J. Müller, 1821
- Mycetophagus quadripustulatus (Linnaeus, 1761)
- Typhaea stercorea (Linnaeus, 1758)
- Eulagius filicornis (Reitter, 1887)

== Family Ciidae ==
- Octotemnus glabriculus (Gyllenhal, 1827)
- Ropalodontus perforatus (Gyllenhal, 1813)
- Sulcacis affinis (Gyllenhal, 1827)
- Strigocis bicornis (Mellié, 1849)
- Orthocis alni (Gyllenhal, 1813)
- Orthocis coluber (Abeille, 1874)
- Cis bidentatus (Olivier, 1790)
- Cis bilamellatus Wood, 1884
- Cis boleti (Scopoli, 1763)
- Cis dentatus Mellié, 1849
- Cis fagi Waltl, 1839
- Cis festivus (Panzer, 1793)
- Cis hispidus (Paykull, 1798)
- Cis jacquemartii Mellié, 1849
- Cis lineatocribratus Mellié, 1849
- Cis micans (Fabricius, 1792)
- Cis nitidus (Fabricius, 1792)
- Cis punctulatus Gyllenhal, 1827
- Cis pygmaeus (Marsham, 1802)
- Cis vestitus Mellié, 1849
- Cis villosulus (Marsham, 1802)
- Ennearthron cornutum (Gyllenhal, 1827)

== Family Tetratomidae ==
- Hallomenus binotatus (Quensel, 1790)
- Tetratoma ancora Fabricius, 1791
- Tetratoma desmarestii Latreille, 1807
- Tetratoma fungorum Fabricius, 1790

== Family Melandryidae ==
- Orchesia micans (Panzer, 1793)
- Orchesia minor Walker, 1836
- Orchesia undulata Kraatz, 1853
- Anisoxya fuscula (Illiger, 1798)
- Abdera affinis (Paykull, 1799)
- Abdera biflexuosa (Curtis, 1829)
- Abdera flexuosa (Paykull, 1799)
- Abdera quadrifasciata (Curtis, 1829) ?
- Abdera triguttata (Gyllenhal, 1810)
- Phloiotrya vaudoueri Mulsant, 1856
- Xylita laevigata (Hellenius, 1786)
- Hypulus quercinus (Quensel, 1790)
- Zilora ferruginea (Paykull, 1798)
- Melandrya barbata (Fabricius, 1787)
- Melandrya caraboides (Linnaeus, 1761)
- Conopalpus testaceus (Olivier, 1790)
- Osphya bipunctata (Fabricius, 1775)

== Family Mordellidae ==
- Tomoxia bucephala A. Costa, 1853
- Mordella holomelaena Apfelbeck, 1914
- Mordella leucaspis Küster, 1849
- Variimorda villosa (Schrank, 1781)
- Mordellistena brevicauda (Boheman, 1849)
- Mordellistena humeralis (Linnaeus, 1758)
- Mordellistena neuwaldeggiana (Panzer, 1796)
- Mordellistena parvula (Gyllenhal, 1827)
- Mordellistena pseudoparvula Ermisch, 1956
- Mordellistena pseudopumila Ermisch, 1962
- Mordellistena pumila (Gyllenhal, 1810)
- Mordellistena pygmaeola Ermisch, 1956
- Mordellistena secreta Horák, 1983
- Mordellistena variegata (Fabricius, 1798)
- Mordellistena acuticollis Schilsky, 1895
- Mordellistena nanuloides Ermisch, 1967
- Mordellochroa abdominalis (Fabricius, 1775)

== Family Ripiphoridae ==
- Metoecus paradoxus (Linnaeus, 1761)

== Family Zopheridae ==
- Pycnomerus fuliginosus Erichson, 1842
- Orthocerus clavicornis (Linnaeus, 1758)
- Synchita humeralis (Fabricius, 1792)
- Synchita separanda (Reitter, 1882)
- Cicones undatus Guérin-Méneville, 1829
- Cicones variegatus (Hellwig, 1792) (may belong in Synchita)
- Bitoma crenata (Fabricius, 1775)
- Endophloeus markovichianus (Piller & Mitterpacher, 1783)
- Langelandia anophthalma Aubé, 1843
- Colydium elongatum (Fabricius, 1787)
- Aulonium ruficorne (Olivier, 1790)
- Aulonium trisulcus (Geoffroy in Fourcroy, 1785)

== Family Tenebrionidae ==
- Lagria atripes Mulsant & Guillebeau, 1855
- Lagria hirta (Linnaeus, 1758)
- Bolitophagus reticulatus (Linnaeus, 1767)
- Eledona agricola (Herbst, 1783)
- Tenebrio molitor Linnaeus, 1758
- Tenebrio obscurus Fabricius, 1792
- Alphitobius diaperinus (Panzer, 1796)
- Alphitobius laevigatus (Fabricius, 1781)
- Tribolium castaneum (Herbst, 1797)
- Tribolium confusum Jacquelin du Val, 1863
- Tribolium destructor Uyttenboogaart, 1934
- Latheticus oryzae C. O. Waterhouse, 1880
- Palorus ratzeburgii (Wissmann, 1848)
- Palorus subdepressus (Wollaston, 1864)
- Uloma culinaris (Linnaeus, 1758)
- Phylan gibbus (Fabricius, 1775)
- Melanimon tibialis (Fabricius, 1781)
- Opatrum sabulosum (Linnaeus, 1758)
- Helops caeruleus (Linnaeus, 1758)
- Nalassus laevioctostriatus (Goeze, 1777)
- Xanthomus pallidus (Curtis, 1830)
- Blaps lethifera Marsham, 1802
- Blaps mortisaga (Linnaeus, 1758)
- Blaps mucronata Latreille, 1804
- Crypticus quisquilius (Linnaeus, 1761)
- Phaleria cadaverina (Fabricius, 1792)
- Myrmechixenus subterraneus Chevrolat, 1835
- Myrmechixenus vaporariorum Guérin-Méneville, 1843
- Corticeus bicolor (Olivier, 1790)
- Corticeus fraxini (Kugelann, 1794)
- Corticeus linearis (Fabricius, 1790)
- Corticeus unicolor Piller & Mitterpacher, 1783
- Scaphidema metallicum (Fabricius, 1793)
- Alphitophagus bifasciatus (Say, 1823)
- Gnatocerus cornutus (Fabricius, 1798)
- Gnatocerus maxillosus (Fabricius, 1801)
- Pentaphyllus testaceus (Hellwig, 1792)
- Platydema violaceum (Fabricius, 1790)
- Diaperis boleti (Linnaeus, 1758)
- Prionychus ater (Fabricius, 1775)
- Prionychus melanarius (Germar, 1813)
- Gonodera luperus (Herbst, 1783)
- Pseudocistela ceramboides (Linnaeus, 1758)
- Isomira murina (Linnaeus, 1758)
- Mycetochara humeralis (Fabricius, 1787)
- Cteniopus sulphureus (Linnaeus, 1758)
- Omophlus betulae (Herbst, 1783)

== Family Oedemeridae ==
- Nacerdes melanura (Linnaeus, 1758)
- Chrysanthia geniculata (formerly Chrysanthia nigricornis)
- Ischnomera caerulea (Linnaeus, 1758)
- Ischnomera cinerascens (Pandellé, 1867)
- Ischnomera cyanea (Fabricius, 1793)
- Ischnomera sanguinicollis (Fabricius, 1787)
- Oedemera femoralis (formerly Oncomera femorata)
- Oedemera lurida (Marsham, 1802)
- Oedemera nobilis (Scopoli, 1763)
- Oedemera virescens (Linnaeus, 1767)

== Family Meloidae ==
- Lytta vesicatoria (Linnaeus, 1758)
- Meloe autumnalis Olivier, 1792
- Meloe brevicollis Panzer, 1793
- Meloe cicatricosus Leach, 1813
- Meloe mediterraneus J. Müller, 1925
- Meloe proscarabaeus Linnaeus, 1758
- Meloe rugosus Marsham, 1802
- Meloe variegatus Donovan, 1793
- Meloe violaceus Marsham, 1802
- Sitaris muralis (Forster, 1771)

== Family Mycteridae ==
- Mycterus curculioides (Fabricius, 1781)

== Family Pythidae ==
- Pytho depressus (Linnaeus, 1767)

== Family Pyrochroidae ==
- Pyrochroa coccinea (Linnaeus, 1761)
- Pyrochroa serraticornis (Scopoli, 1763)
- Schizotus pectinicornis (Linnaeus, 1758)

== Family Salpingidae ==
- Aglenus brunneus (Gyllenhal, 1813)
- Lissodema cursor (Gyllenhal, 1813)
- Lissodema denticolle (Gyllenhal, 1813)
- Rabocerus foveolatus (Ljungh, 1824)
- Rabocerus gabrieli Gerhardt, 1901
- Sphaeriestes ater (Paykull, 1798)
- Sphaeriestes castaneus (Panzer, 1796)
- Sphaeriestes reyi (Abeille, 1874)
- Vincenzellus ruficollis (Panzer, 1794)
- Salpingus planirostris (Fabricius, 1787)
- Salpingus ruficollis (Linnaeus, 1761)

== Family Anthicidae ==
- Notoxus monoceros (Linnaeus, 1761)
- Anthicus angustatus Curtis, 1838
- Anthicus antherinus (Linnaeus, 1761)
- Anthicus bimaculatus (Illiger, 1801)
- Anthicus flavipes (Panzer, 1797)
- Anthicus tristis Schmidt, 1842
- Cyclodinus constrictus (Curtis, 1838)
- Cyclodinus salinus (Crotch, 1867)
- Omonadus bifasciatus (Rossi, 1792)
- Omonadus floralis (Linnaeus, 1758)
- Omonadus formicarius (Goeze, 1777)
- Cordicomus instabilis (Schmidt, 1842)
- Stricticomus tobias (Marseul, 1879)

== Family Aderidae ==
- Aderus populneus (Creutzer in Panzer, 1796)
- Euglenes oculatus (Paykull, 1798)
- Vanonus brevicornis (Perris, 1869)

== Family Scraptiidae ==
- Scraptia dubia (Olivier, 1790)
- Scraptia fuscula P. W. J. Müller, 1821
- Scraptia testacea Allen, 1940
- Anaspis bohemica Schilsky, 1898
- Anaspis fasciata (Forster, 1771)
- Anaspis frontalis (Linnaeus, 1758)
- Anaspis garneysi Fowler, 1889
- Anaspis lurida Stephens, 1832
- Anaspis maculata (Geoffroy in Fourcroy, 1785)
- Anaspis pulicaria A. Costa, 1854
- Anaspis regimbarti Schilsky, 1895
- Anaspis thoracica (Linnaeus, 1758)
- Anaspis costai Emery, 1876
- Anaspis rufilabris (Gyllenhal, 1827)
