= Abdera =

Abdera may refer to:

- Abdera, Thrace, a city and municipality in Greece
- Abdera, Spain, an ancient city
- Apache Abdera, an implementation of the Atom Syndication Format and Atom Publishing Protocol
- Abdera (beetle), a genus of false darkling beetles
- Abdera acraea (Acraea abdera), a butterfly of the family Nymphalidae
