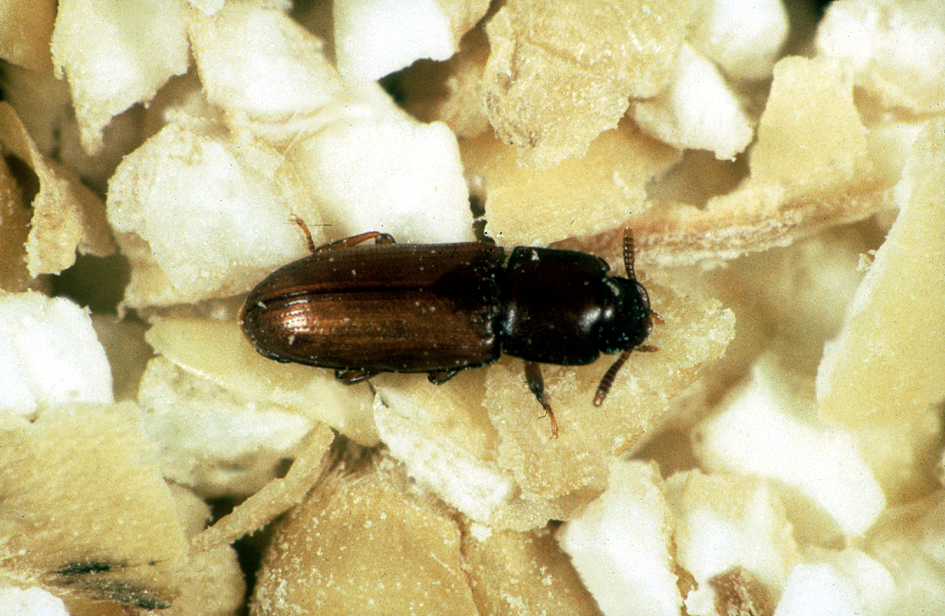
- Smalleyed flour beetle, Palorus ratzeburgi

Scientific classification
- Domain: Eukaryota
- Kingdom: Animalia
- Phylum: Arthropoda
- Class: Insecta
- Order: Coleoptera
- Suborder: Polyphaga
- Infraorder: Cucujiformia
- Family: Tenebrionidae
- Subfamily: Tenebrioninae
- Tribe: Palorini; Matthews, 2003

= Palorini =

Tribe of beetles

Palorini is a tribe of darkling beetles in the family Tenebrionidae. There are about 12 genera in Palorini.

== Genera ==
These genera belong to the tribe Palorini:

- Astalbus Fairmaire, 1900 (tropical Africa)
- Austropalorus Halstead, 1967 (Australasia)
- Eutermicola Lea, 1916 (Australasia)
- Palorinus Blair, 1930 (Indomalaya and Australasia)
- Paloropsis Masumoto & Grimm, 2004 (Indomalaya)
- Palorus Mulsant, 1854 (North America, the Palearctic, Indomalaya, Australasia, and Oceania)
- Platycotylus Olliff, 1883 (tropical Africa, Indomalaya, and Australasia)
- Prolabrus Fairmaire, 1897 (tropical Africa)
- Pseudeba Blackburn, 1903 (Australasia)
- Ulomina Baudi di Selve, 1876 (North America, the Palearctic, Indomalaya, Australasia, and Oceania)
- Ulomotypus Broun, 1886 (Australasia)
- † Vabole Alekseev & Nabozhenko, 2015
