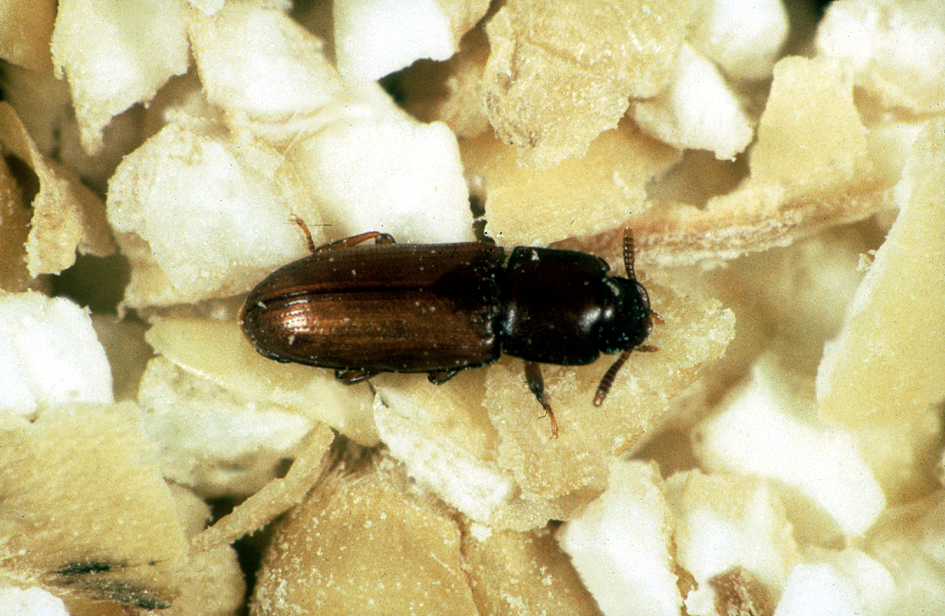
- Palorus ratzeburgii

Scientific classification
- Domain: Eukaryota
- Kingdom: Animalia
- Phylum: Arthropoda
- Class: Insecta
- Order: Coleoptera
- Suborder: Polyphaga
- Infraorder: Cucujiformia
- Family: Tenebrionidae
- Subfamily: Tenebrioninae
- Tribe: Palorini
- Genus: Palorus; Mulsant, 1854

= Palorus =

Genus of beetles

Palorus is a genus of darkling beetles in the family Tenebrionidae. There are at least 4 described species in Palorus.

== Species ==
- Palorus foveicollis Blair, 1930
- Palorus ratzeburgi (Wissmann, 1848)
- Palorus ratzeburgii (Wissmann, 1848) (small-eyed flour beetle)
- Palorus subdepressus (Wollaston, 1864) (depressed flour beetle)
