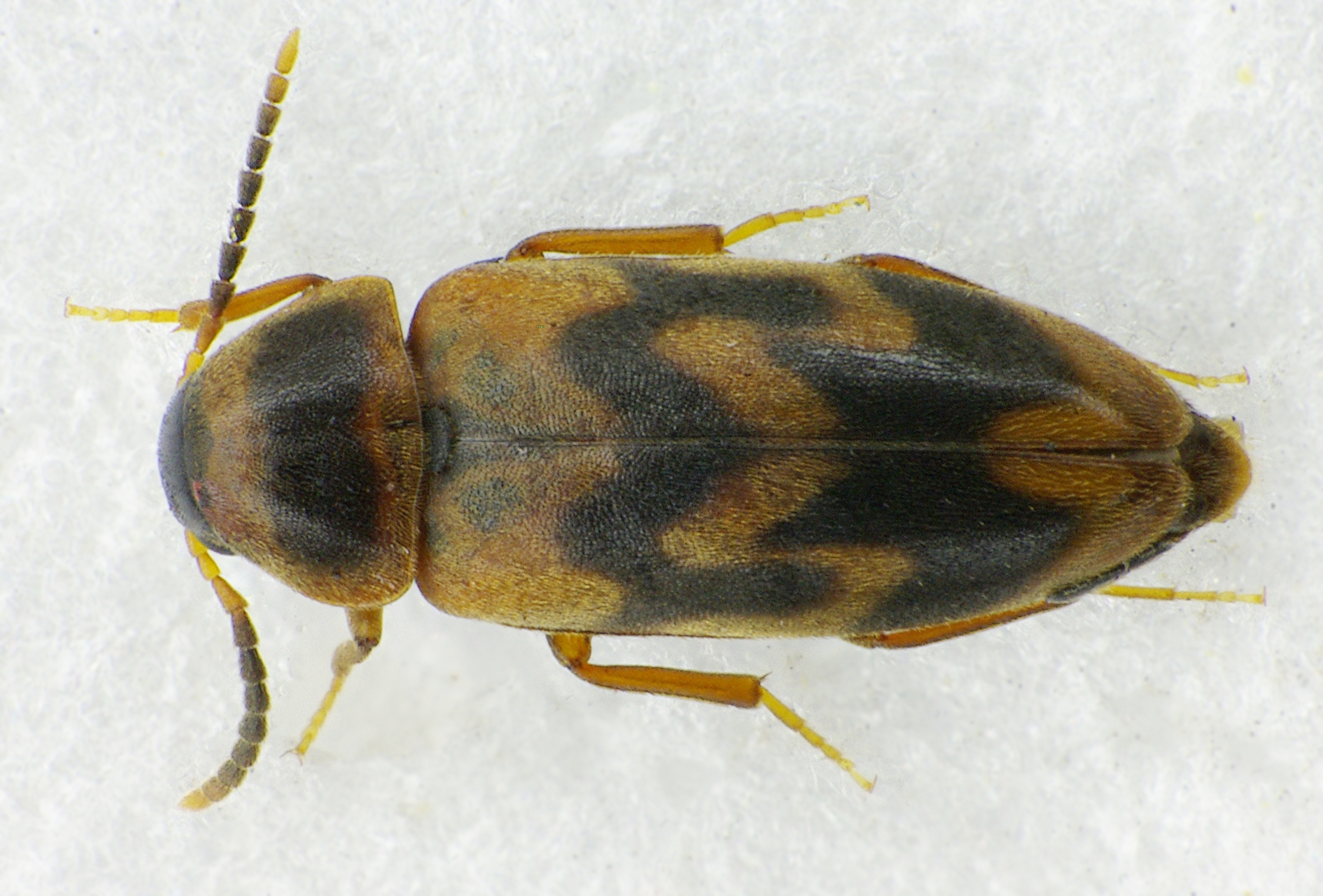

Scientific classification
- Domain: Eukaryota
- Kingdom: Animalia
- Phylum: Arthropoda
- Class: Insecta
- Order: Coleoptera
- Suborder: Polyphaga
- Infraorder: Cucujiformia
- Family: Melandryidae
- Genus: Abdera
- Species: A. flexuosa

Binomial name
- Abdera flexuosa (Paykull, 1799)

= Abdera flexuosa =

Species of beetle

Abdera flexuosa is a species of false darkling beetle (Melandryidae). (Paykull, 1799)

It associates with plants:

- Alnus glutinosa — Black Alder
- Salix — Willow

== See also ==
- List of beetle species recorded in Britain – superfamily Tenebrionoidea
