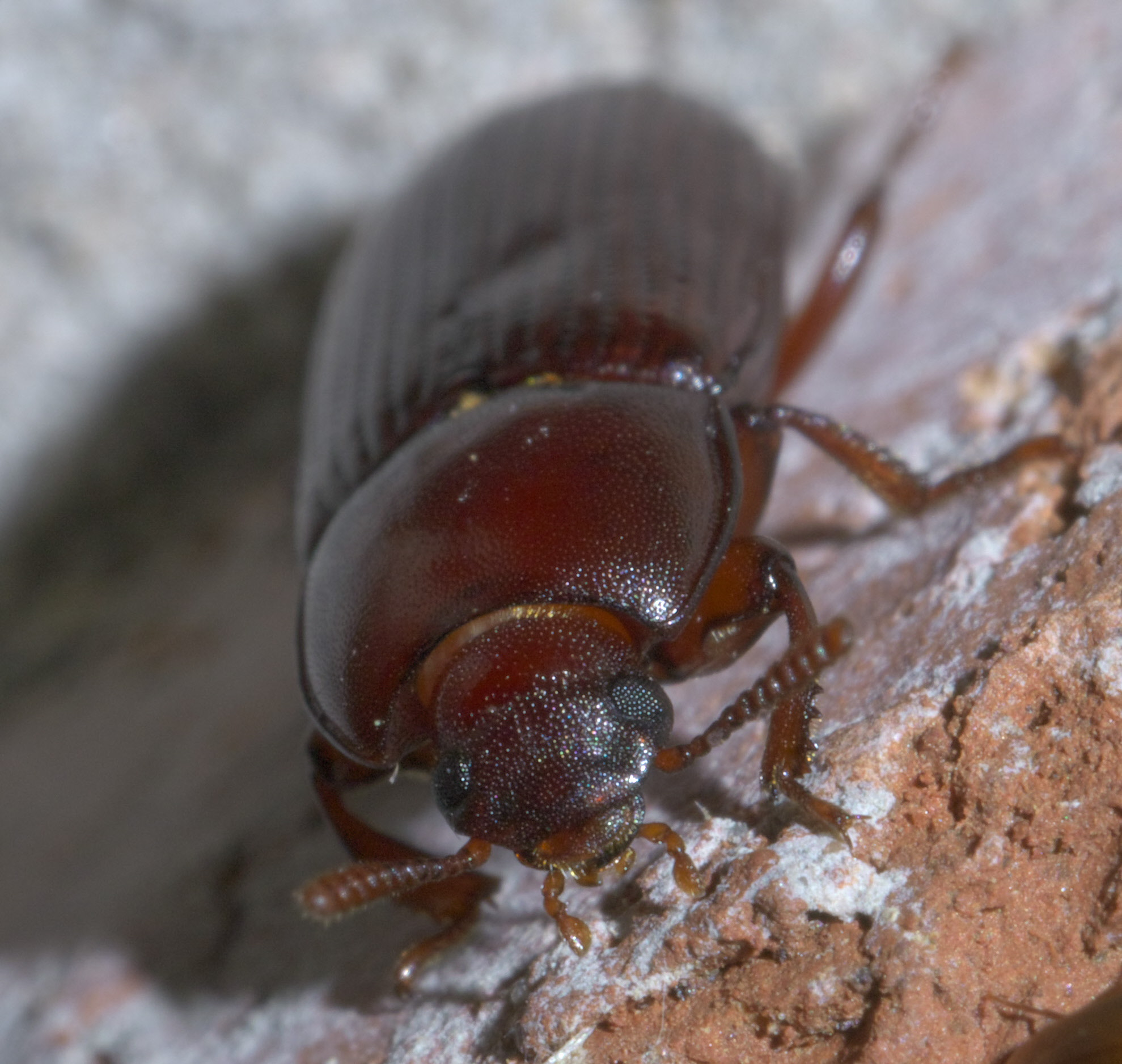

Scientific classification
- Kingdom: Animalia
- Phylum: Arthropoda
- Class: Insecta
- Order: Coleoptera
- Suborder: Polyphaga
- Infraorder: Cucujiformia
- Family: Tenebrionidae
- Tribe: Ulomini
- Genus: Uloma; Dejean, 1821

= Uloma =

Genus of beetles

Uloma is a genus of darkling beetles in the family Tenebrionidae. There are at least 50 described species in Uloma.

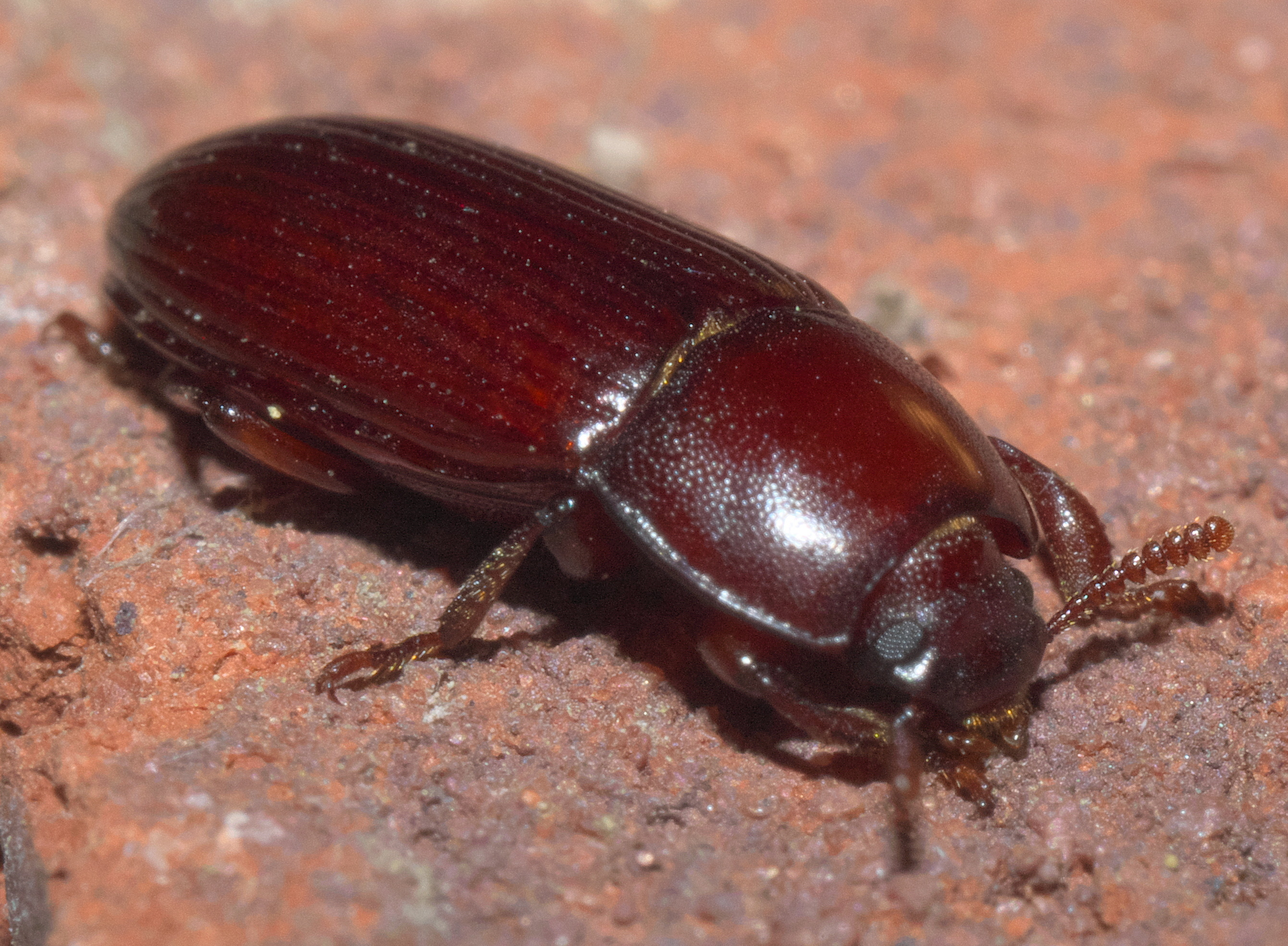

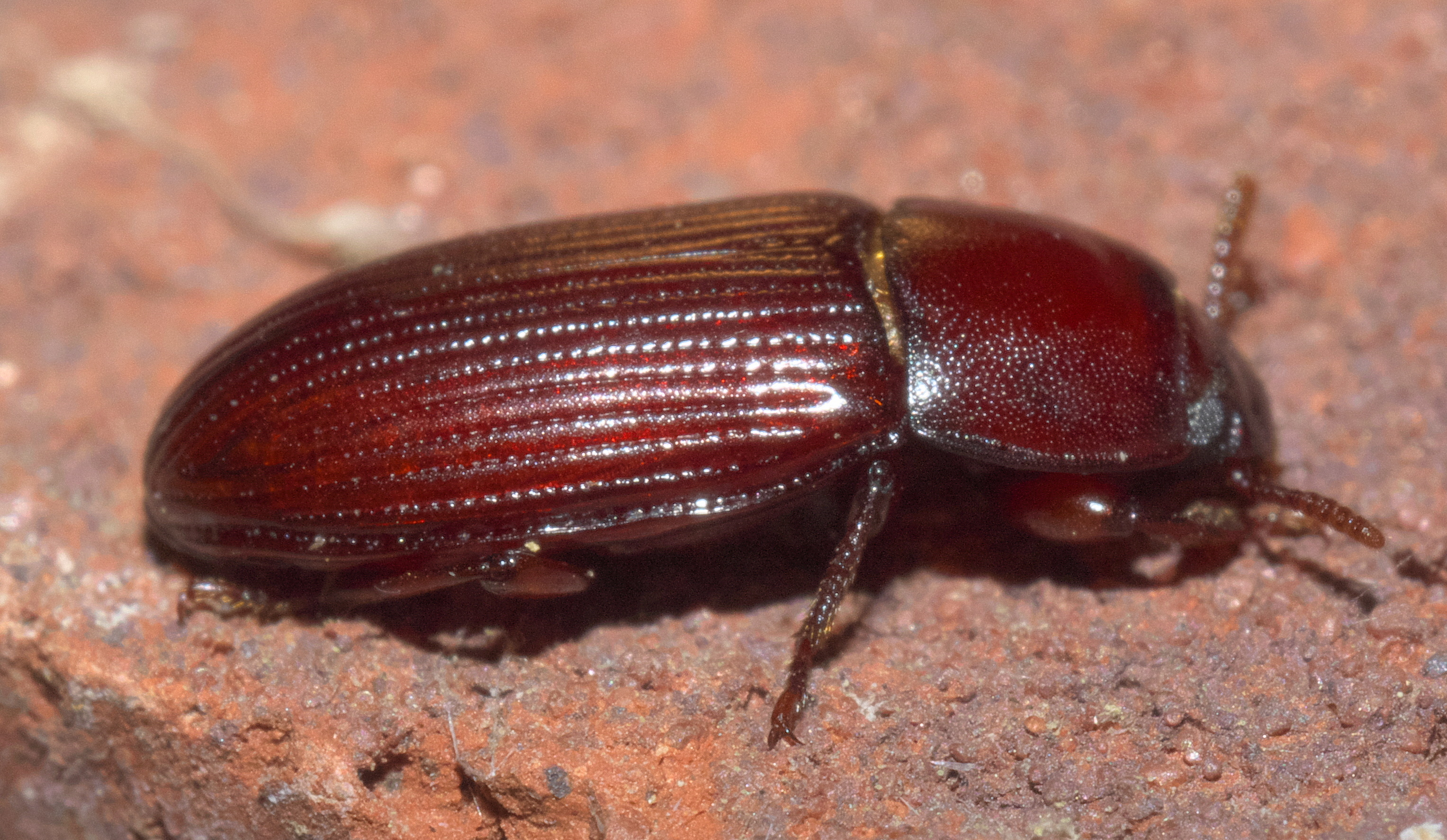

== Species ==
These 50 species belong to the genus Uloma:

- Uloma apicipennis (Fauvel, 1904)^{g}
- Uloma artensis Perroud, 1864^{g}
- Uloma bonzica Marseul, 1876^{i c g}
- Uloma caledonica Kaszab, 1982^{g}
- Uloma clamensae L.Soldati, 2014^{g}
- Uloma condaminei L.Soldati, 2014^{g}
- Uloma crassestriata Kaszab, 1982^{g}
- Uloma damoiseaui Kaszab, 1982^{g}
- Uloma excisa^{g}
- Uloma fauveli Kaszab, 1982^{g}
- Uloma formosana Kaszab, 1941^{g}
- Uloma fortestriata (Fauvel, 1904)^{g}
- Uloma fukiensis Kaszab, 1954^{g}
- Uloma girardi Kaszab, 1982^{g}
- Uloma guadeloupensis Marcuzzi, 1971^{g}
- Uloma imberbis LeConte^{b}
- Uloma impressa Melsh.^{g b}
- Uloma isoceroides (Fauvel, 1904)^{g}
- Uloma jourdani L.Soldati, 2014^{g}
- Uloma kergoati L.Soldati, 2014^{g}
- Uloma kuscheli Kaszab, 1982^{g}
- Uloma longula LeConte, 1861^{g b}
- Uloma major Laporte de Castelnau, 1840^{g}
- Uloma meifengensis Masumoto, 1982^{g}
- Uloma mentalis Horn^{g b}
- Uloma microcephala (Fauvel, 1904)^{g}
- Uloma miriceps (Fauvel, 1904)^{g}
- Uloma miyakei Masumoto & Nishikawa, 1986^{g}
- Uloma monteithi Kaszab, 1986^{g}
- Uloma nakanei Masumoto & Nishikawa, 1986^{g}
- Uloma nanshanchica Masumoto & Nishikawa, 1986^{g}
- Uloma nomurai Masumoto, 1982^{g}
- Uloma novaecaledoniae Kaszab, 1982^{g}
- Uloma opaciceps Kaszab, 1982^{g}
- Uloma opacipennis (Fauvel, 1904)^{g}
- Uloma pachysoma (Montrouzier, 1860)^{g}
- Uloma paniei Kaszab, 1982^{g}
- Uloma polita (Wiedemann, 1821)^{g}
- Uloma punctata (Fauvel, 1904)^{g}
- Uloma punctulata LeConte^{b}
- Uloma retusa Fabricius, 1801^{g b}
- Uloma robusta Kaszab, 1986^{g}
- Uloma rubripes^{g}
- Uloma rufa (Piller & Mitterpacher, 1783)^{g}
- Uloma sanguinipes (Fabricius, 1775)^{g}
- Uloma sarasini Kaszab, 1982^{g}
- Uloma sauteri Kaszab, 1941^{g}
- Uloma sexdecimlineata Montrouzier, 1860^{g}
- Uloma takagii Masumoto & Nishikawa, 1986^{g}
- Uloma tsugeae Masumoto, 1982^{g}

Data sources: i = ITIS, c = Catalogue of Life, g = GBIF, b = Bugguide.net

== Gallery ==
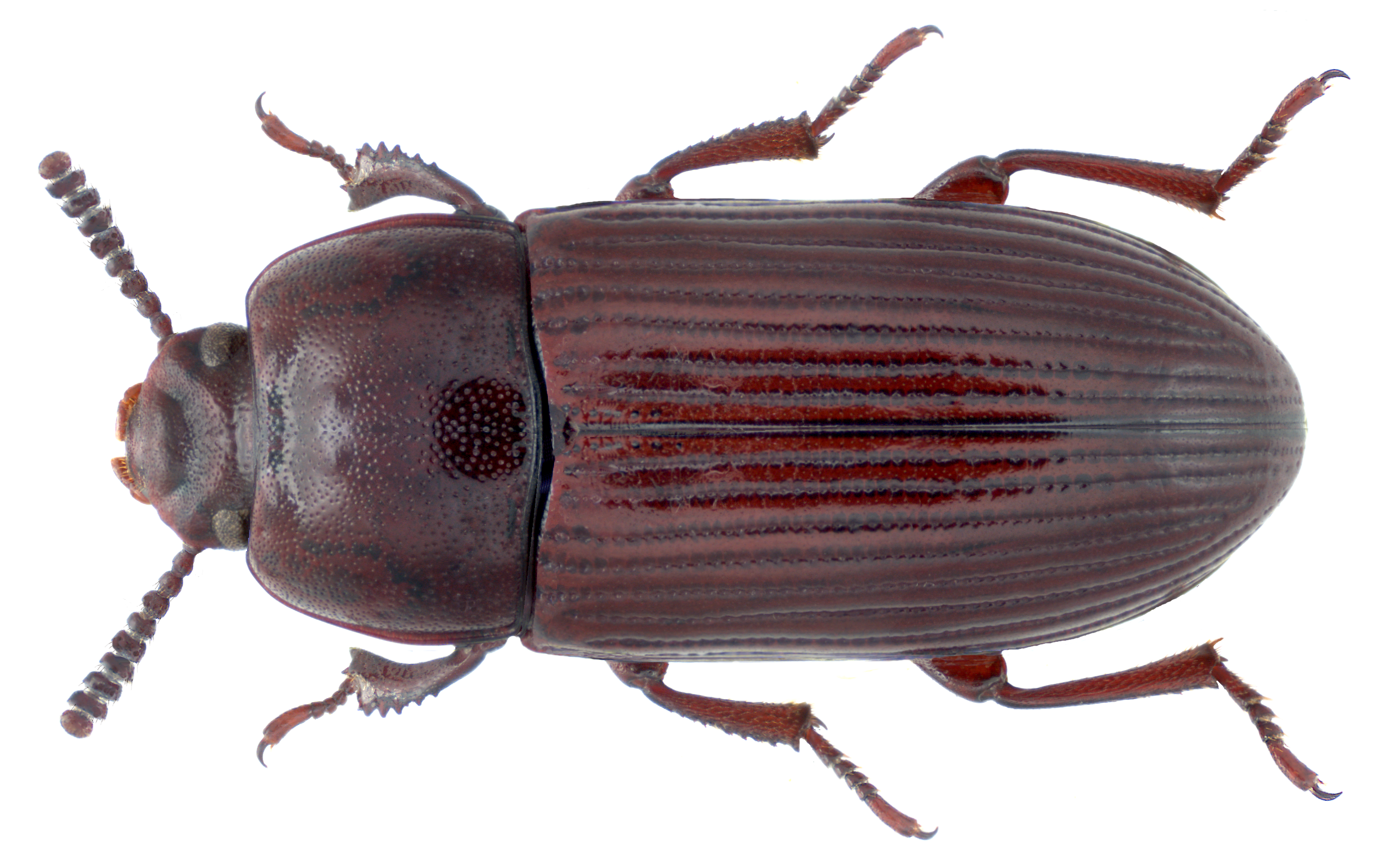
Uloma culinaris

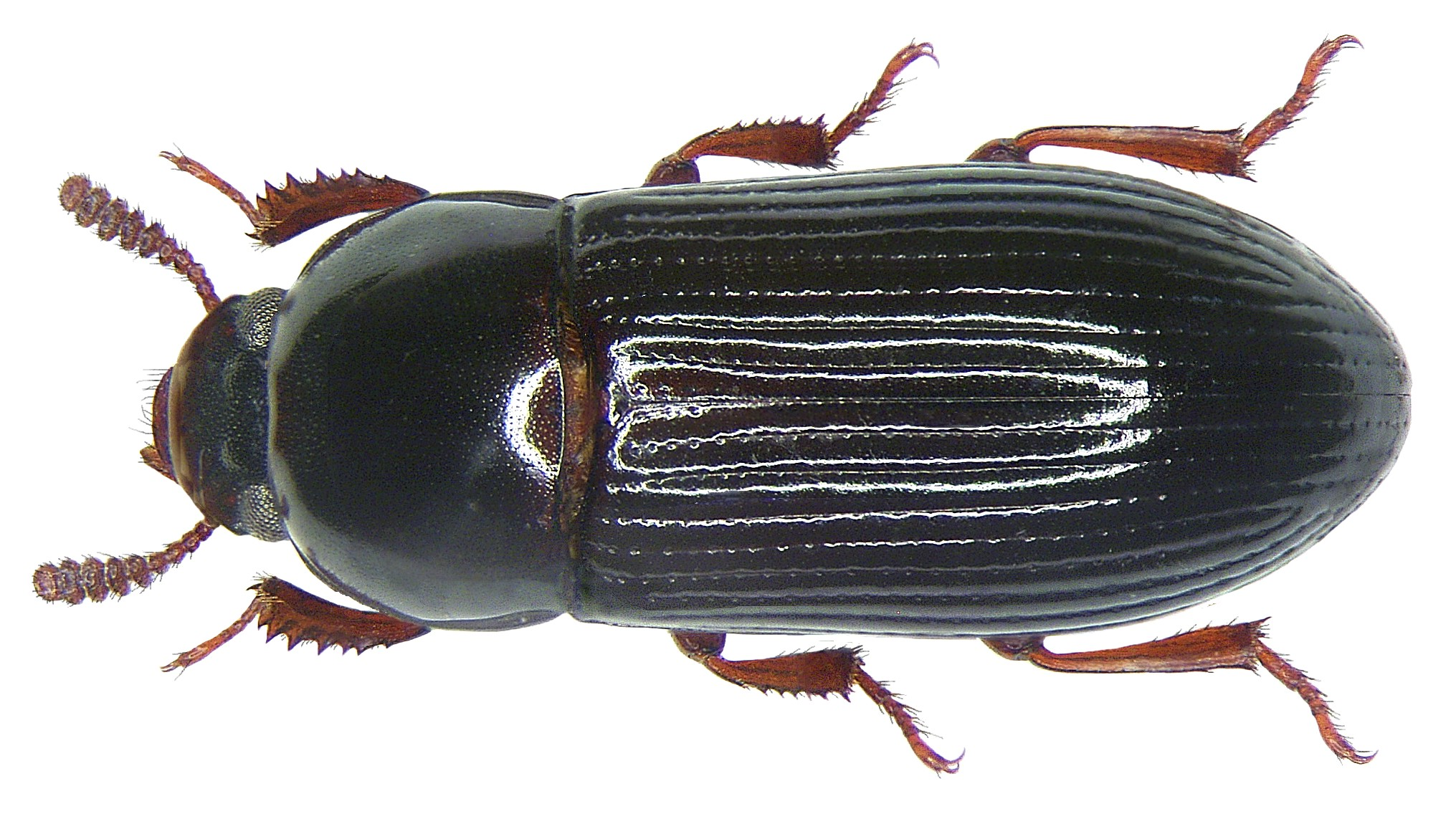
Uloma emarginata

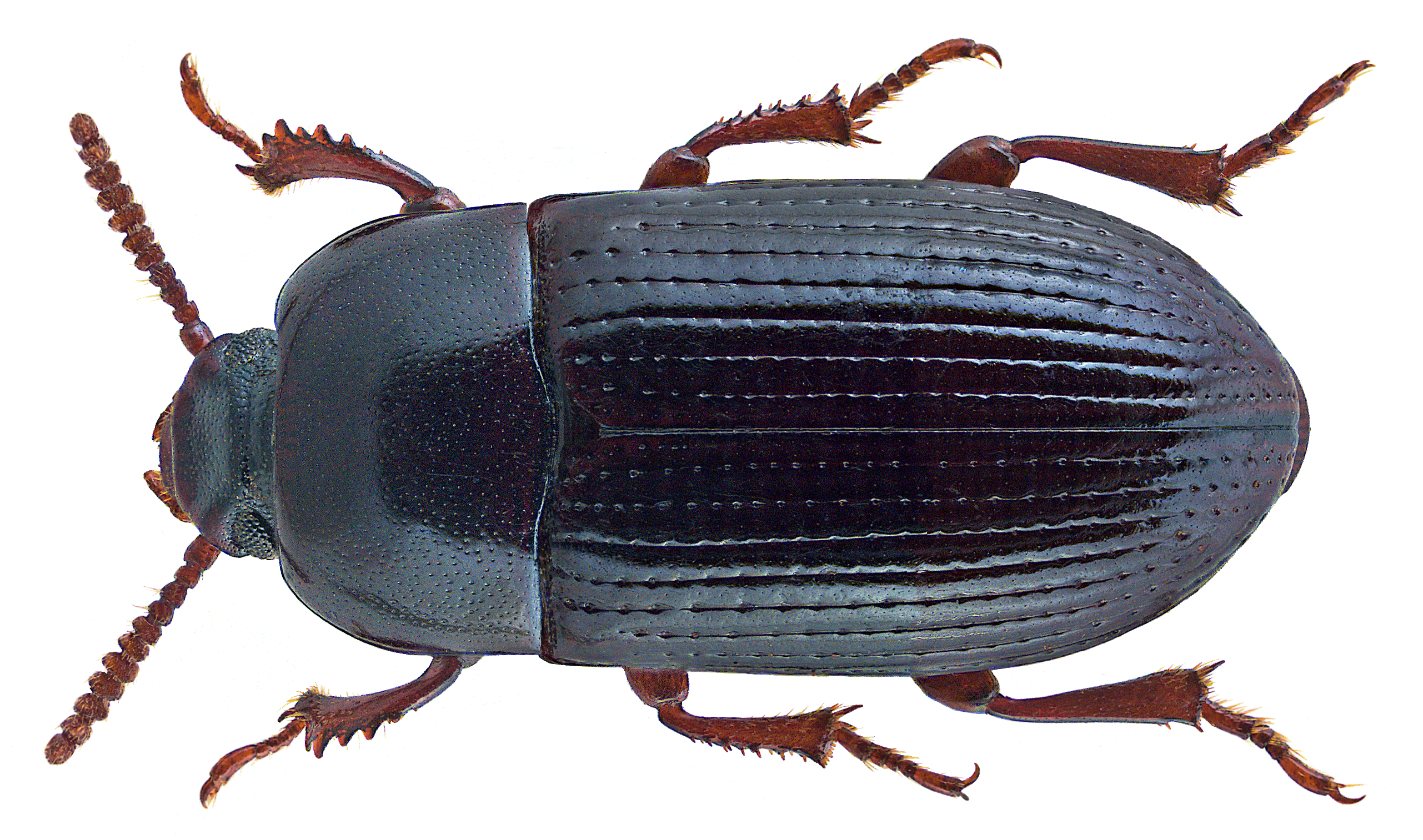
Uloma pusilla

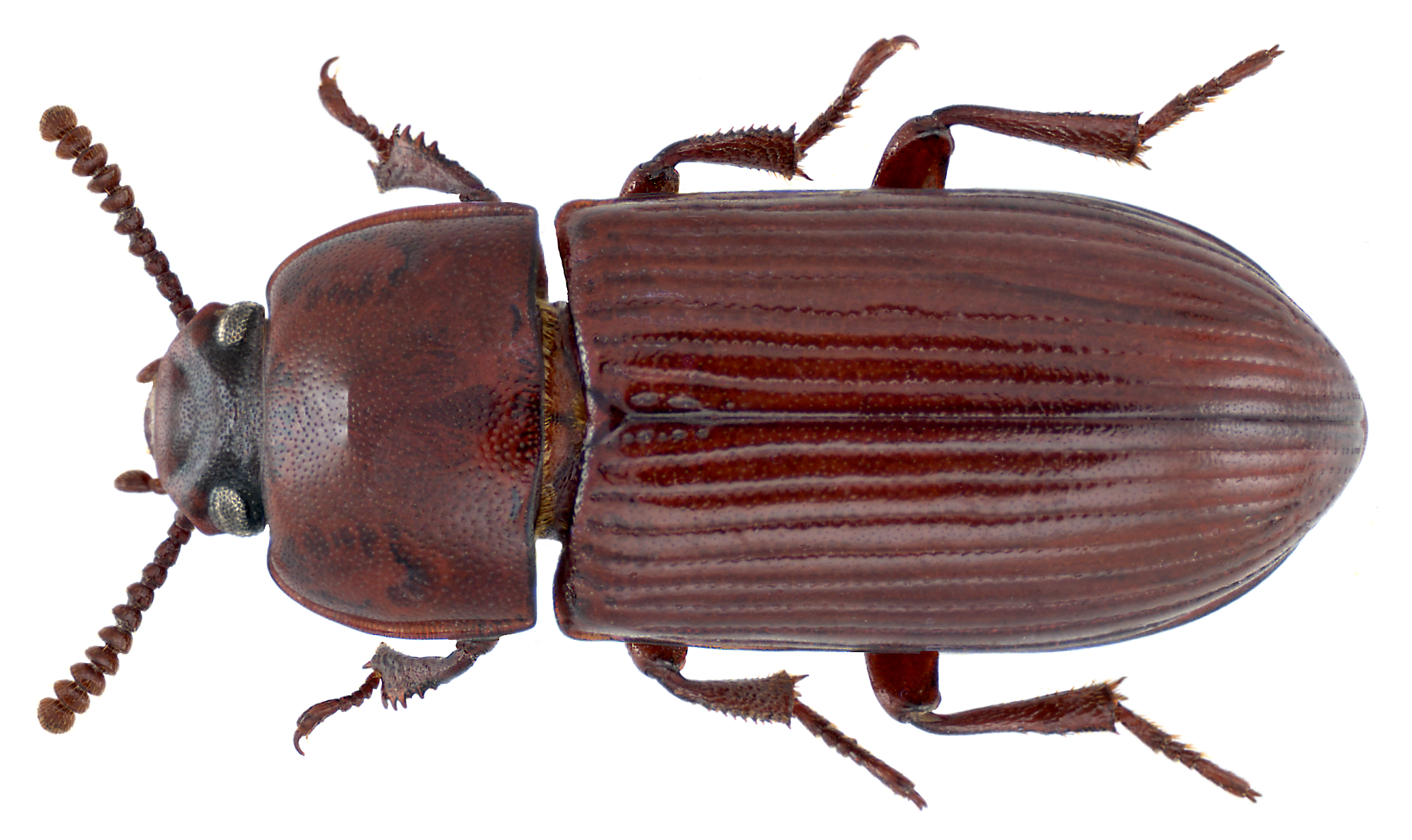
Uloma rufa

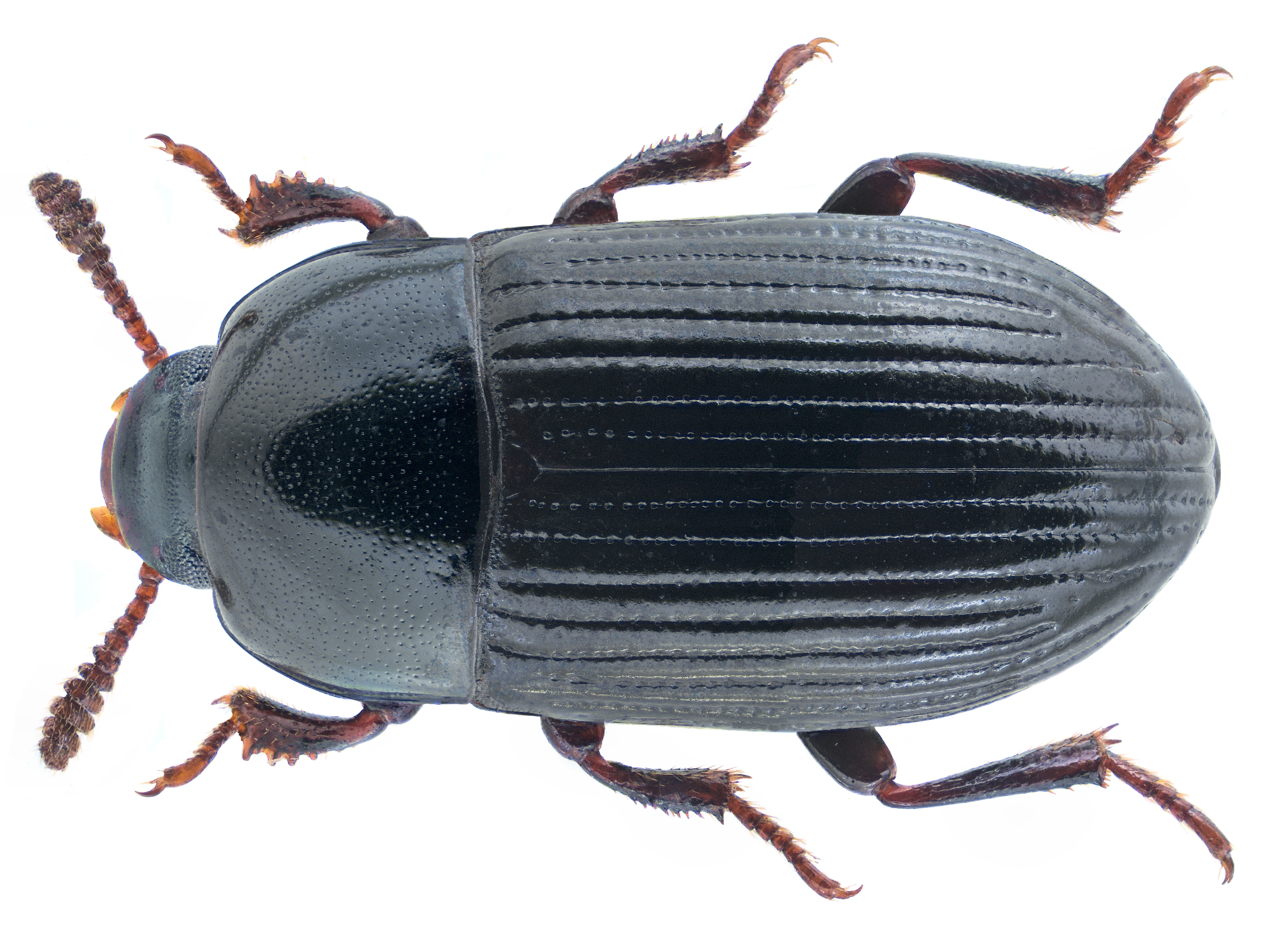
Uloma rufilabris

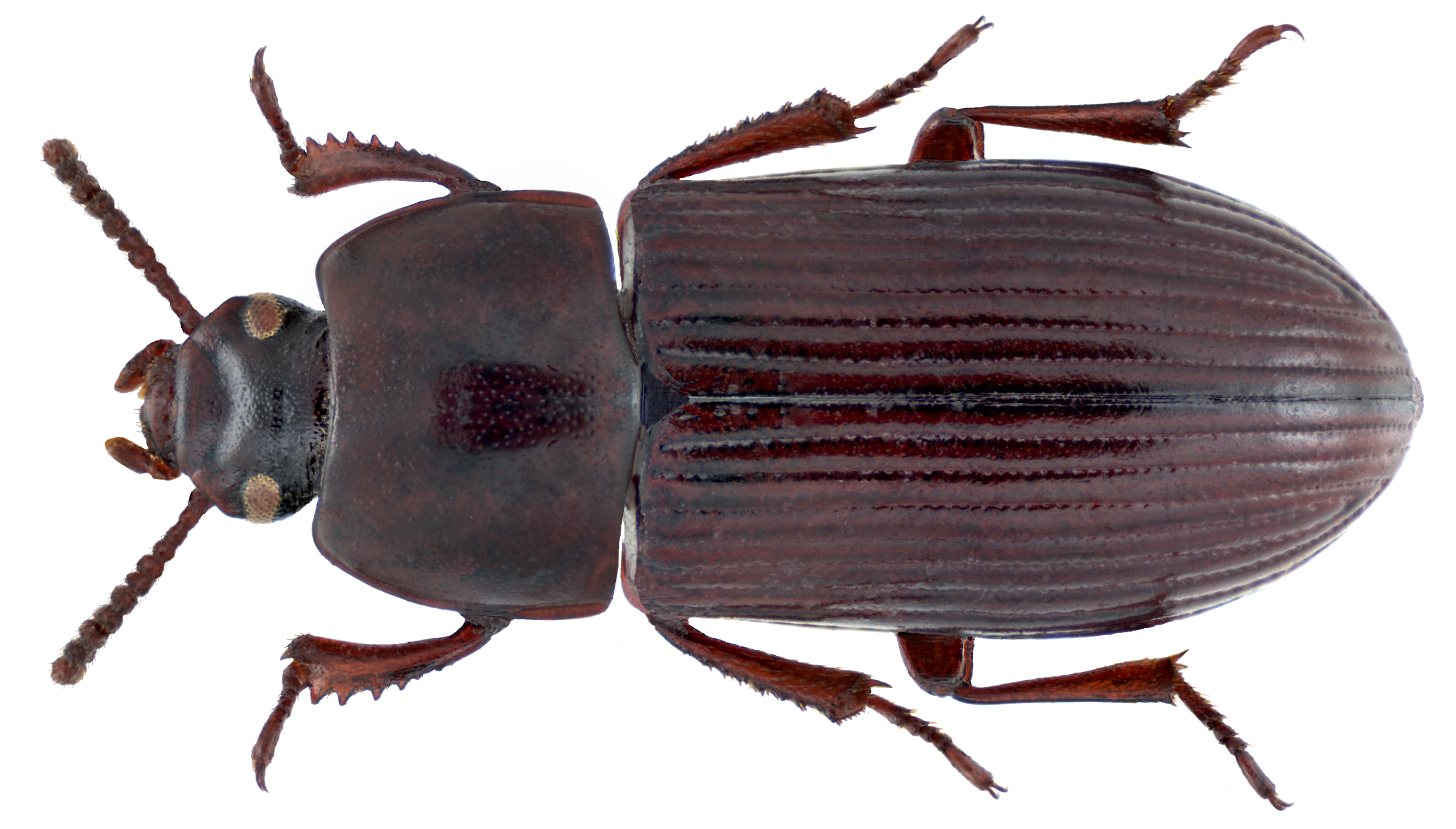
Uloma scita
