= Abdera hoffeinsorum =

Abdera hoffeinsorum Temporal range: Eocene

Scientific classification
- Domain: Eukaryota
- Kingdom: Animalia
- Phylum: Arthropoda
- Class: Insecta
- Order: Coleoptera
- Suborder: Polyphaga
- Infraorder: Cucujiformia
- Family: Melandryidae
- Genus: Abdera
- Species: †A. hoffeinsorum

Binomial name
- †Abdera hoffeinsorum Alekseev, 2014

Extinct species of beetle

Abdera hoffeinsorum is an extinct species of false darkling beetle in the genus Abdera. It was discovered in Baltic amber in 2014.
