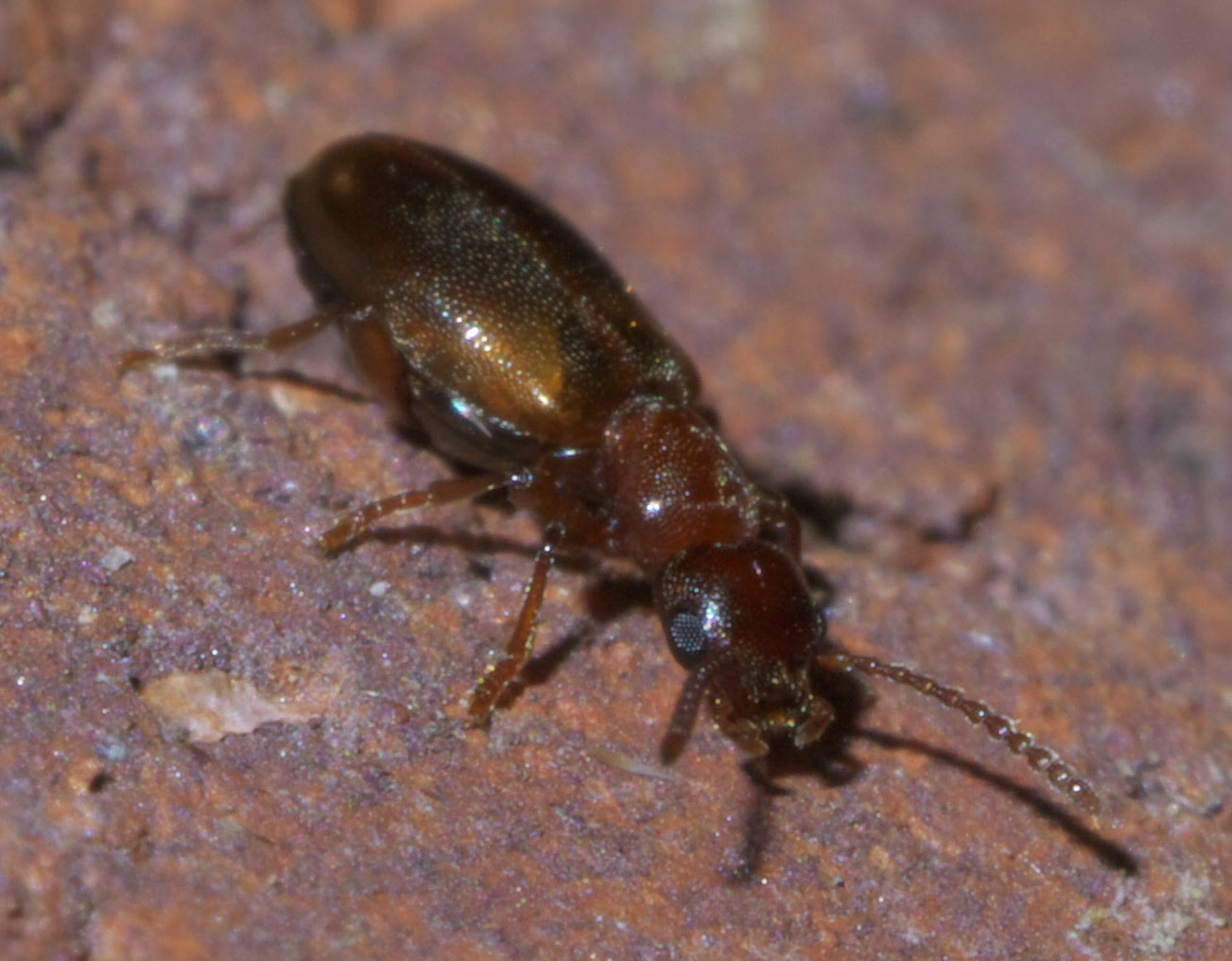
- Omonadus floralis

Scientific classification
- Kingdom: Animalia
- Phylum: Arthropoda
- Clade: Pancrustacea
- Class: Insecta
- Order: Coleoptera
- Suborder: Polyphaga
- Infraorder: Cucujiformia
- Family: Anthicidae
- Subfamily: Anthicinae
- Genus: Omonadus; Mulsant & Rey, 1866

= Omonadus =

Genus of beetles

Omonadus is a genus of antlike flower beetles in the family Anthicidae. There are about seven described species in Omonadus.

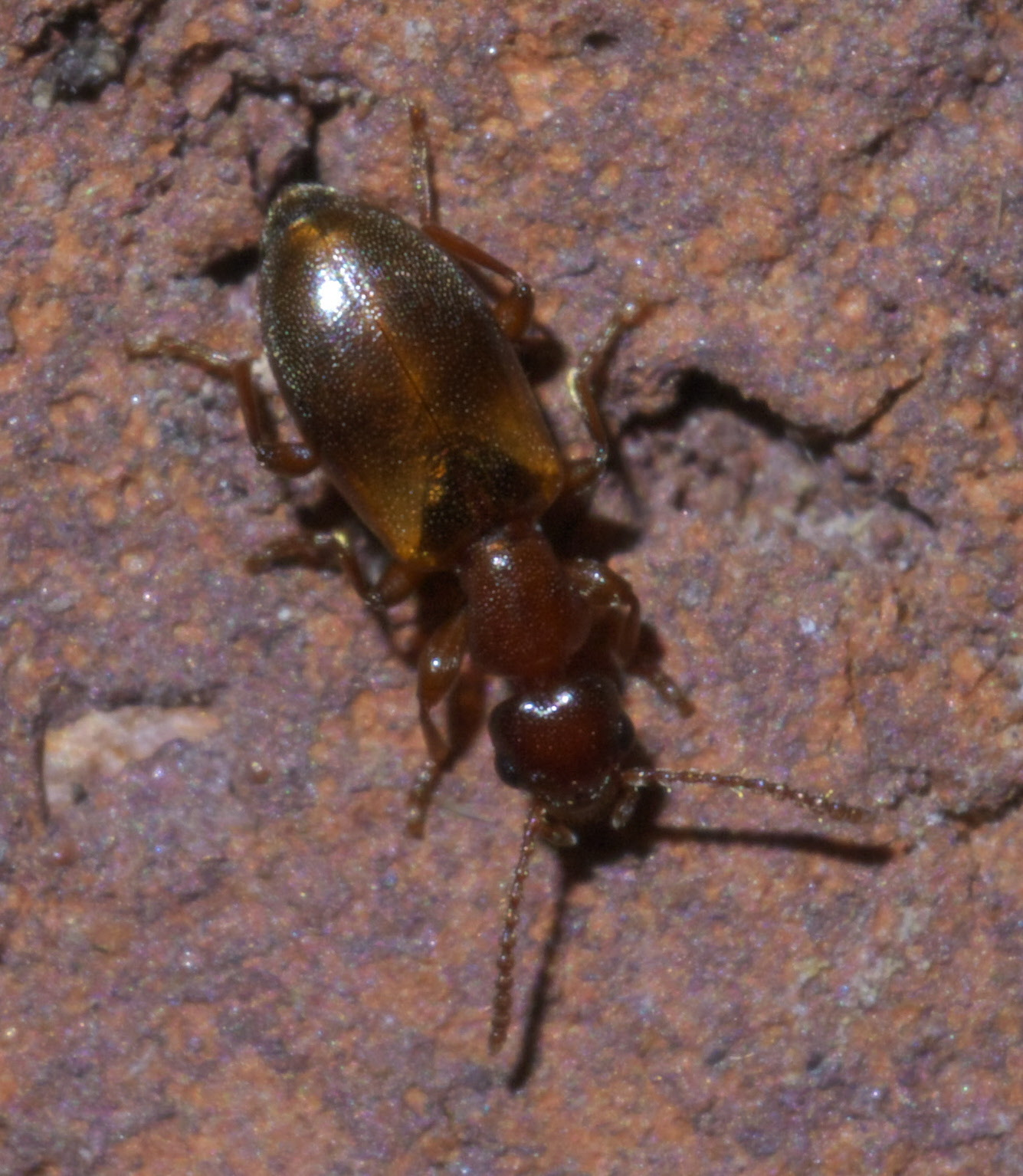
Omonadus floralis

== Species ==
These seven species belong to the genus Omonadus:

- Omonadus anticemaculatus (Pic, 1900)
- Omonadus confucii
- Omonadus floralis (Linnaeus, 1758) (narrow-necked grain beetle)
- Omonadus formicarius (Goeze, 1777)
- Omonadus lateriguttatus (De Marseul, 1879)
- Omonadus phoenicius (Truqui, 1855)
- Omonadus signatellus (Krekich-Strassoldo, 1928)

== Gallery ==
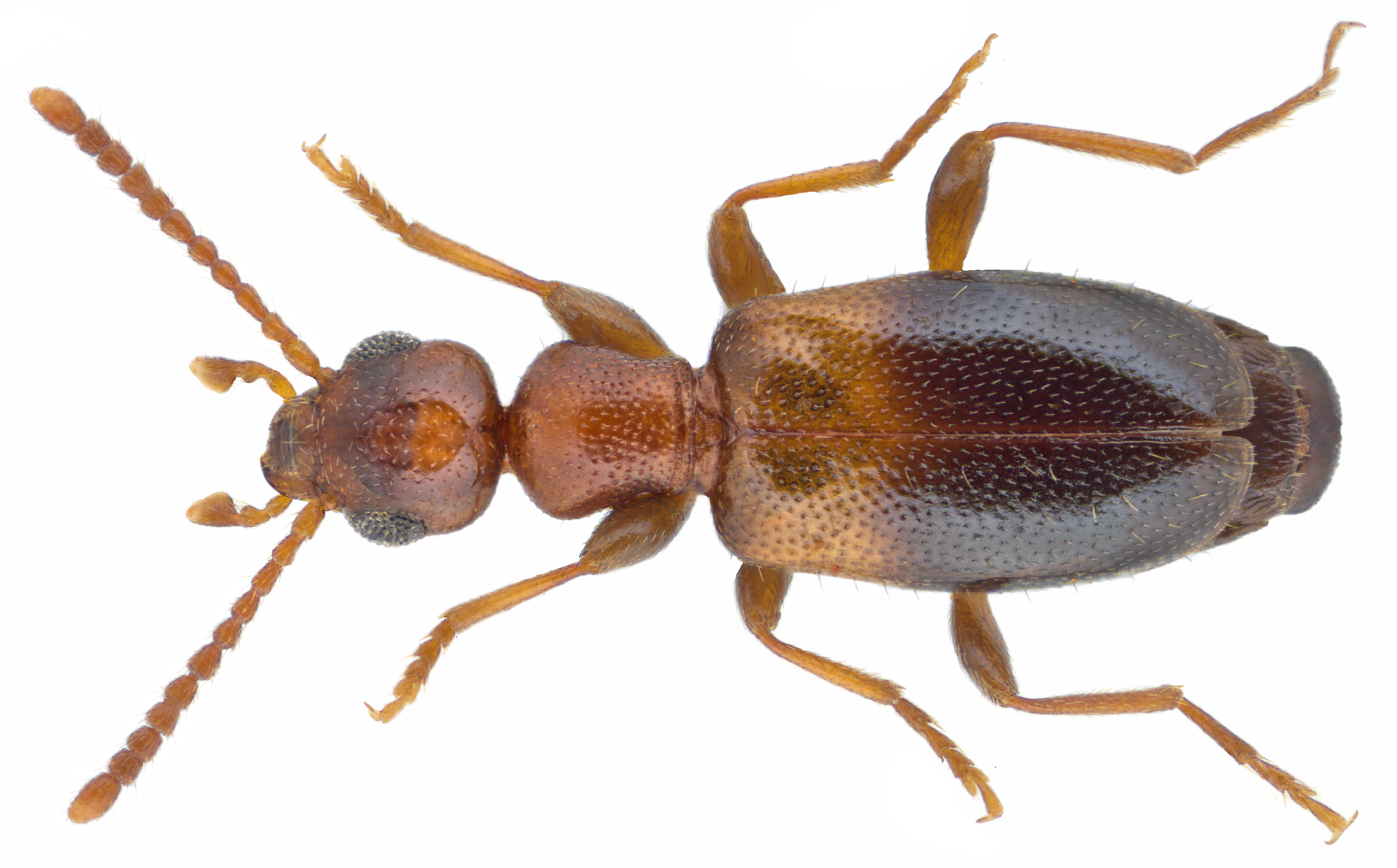
Omonadus bottegoi

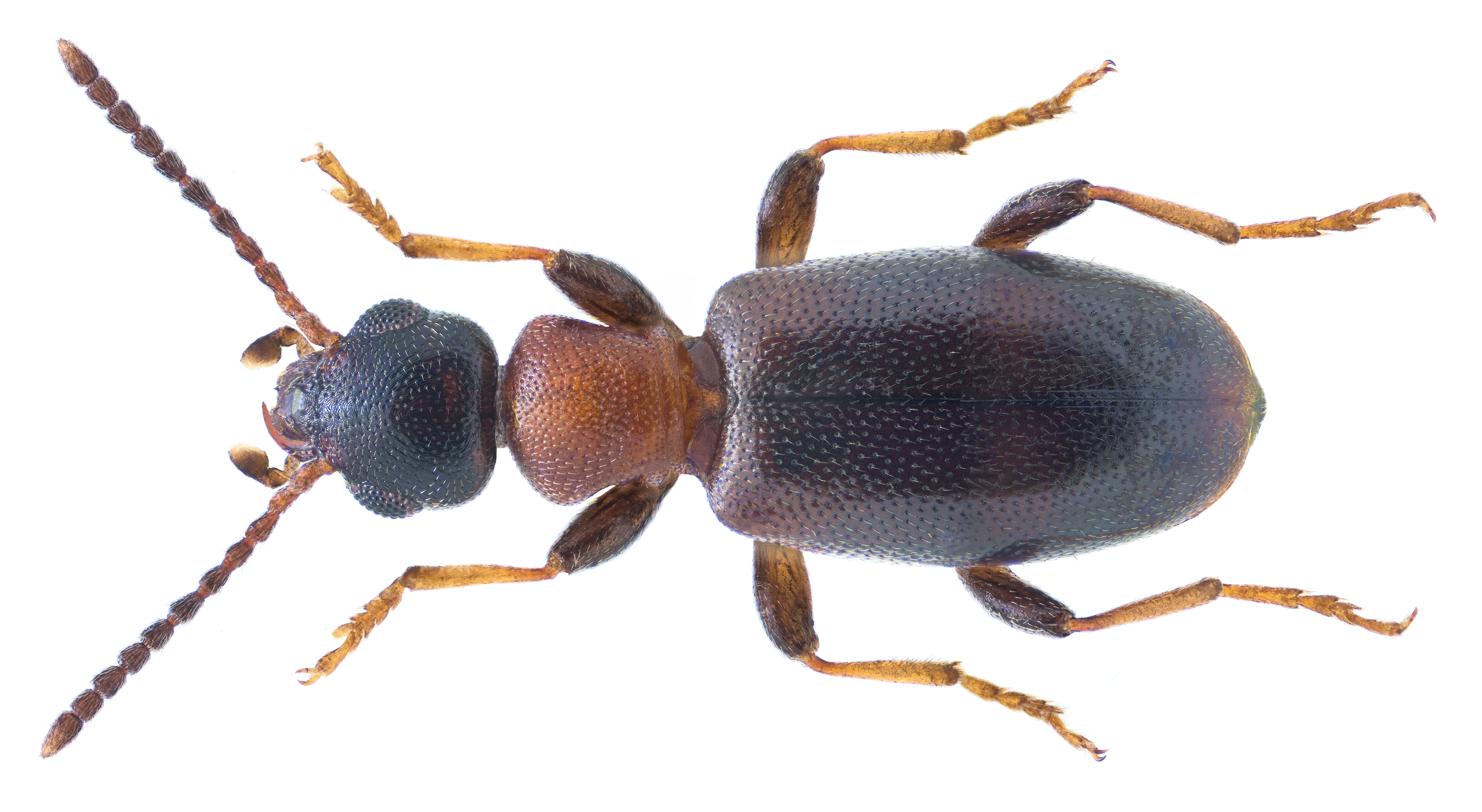
Omonadus confucii

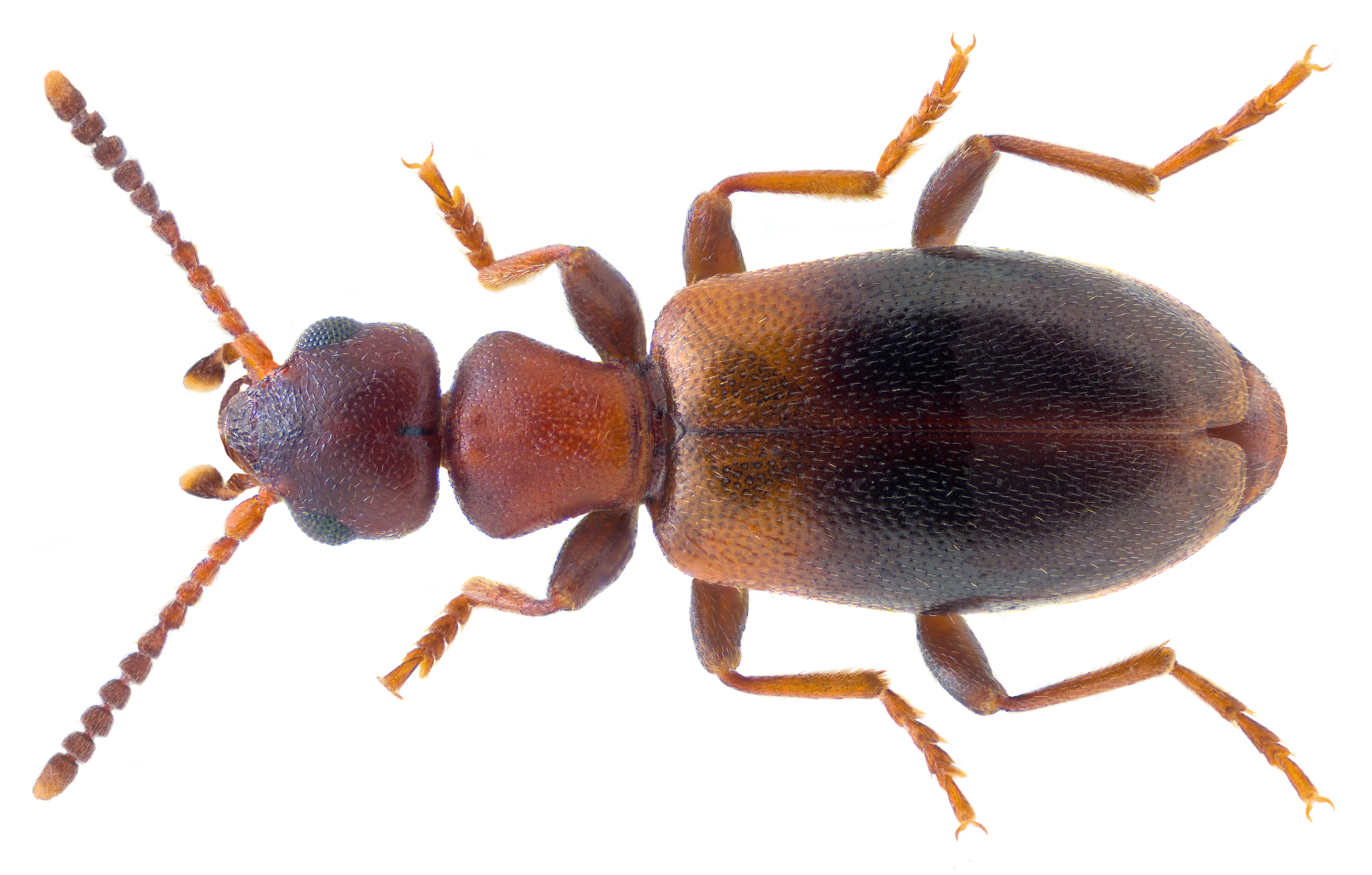
Omonadus floralis

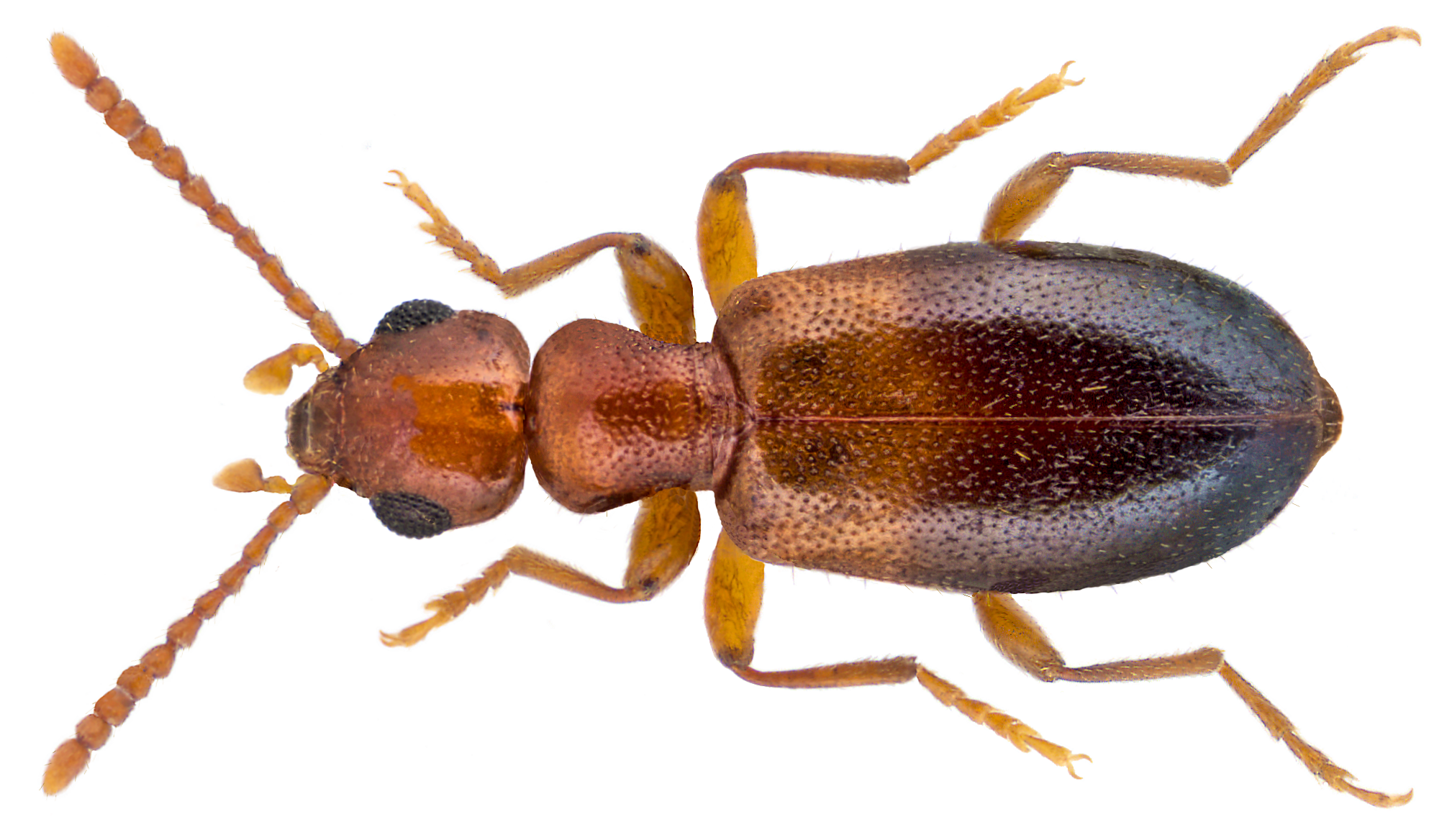
Omonadus mateui

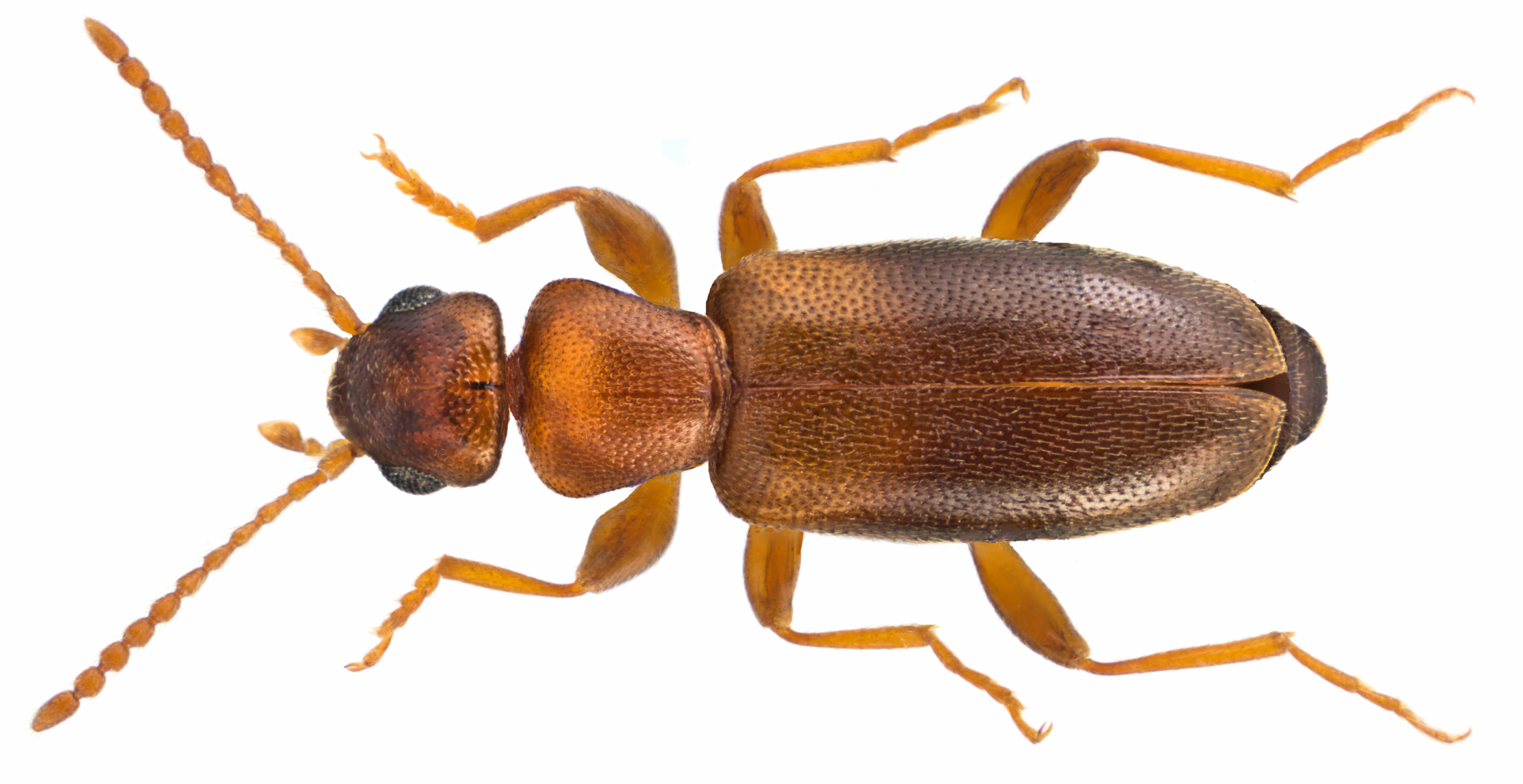
Omonadus robustithorax
