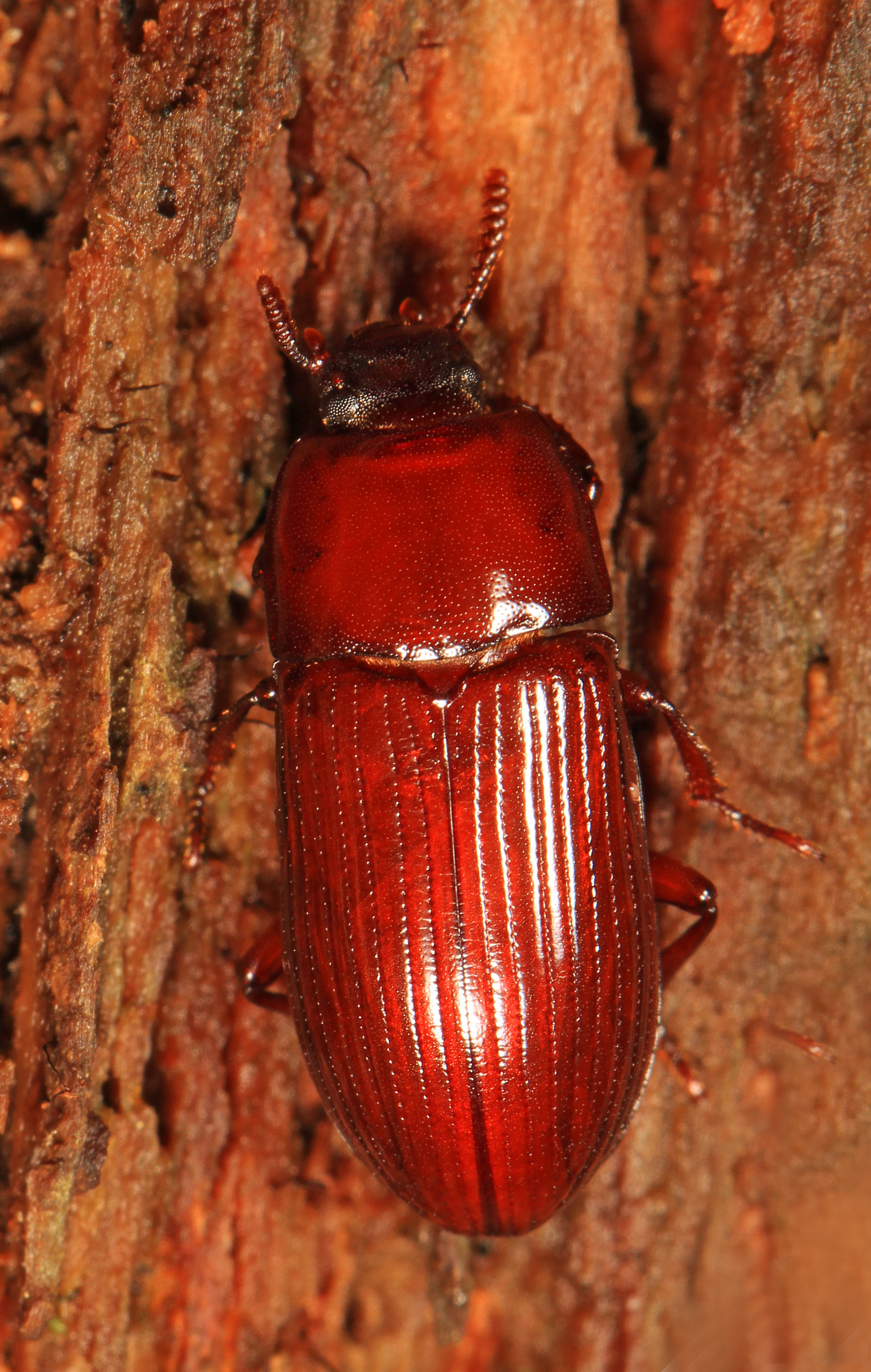

Scientific classification
- Domain: Eukaryota
- Kingdom: Animalia
- Phylum: Arthropoda
- Class: Insecta
- Order: Coleoptera
- Suborder: Polyphaga
- Infraorder: Cucujiformia
- Family: Tenebrionidae
- Genus: Uloma
- Species: U. impressa

Binomial name
- Uloma impressa Melsh.

= Uloma impressa =

Species of beetle

Uloma impressa is a species of darkling beetle in the family Tenebrionidae.

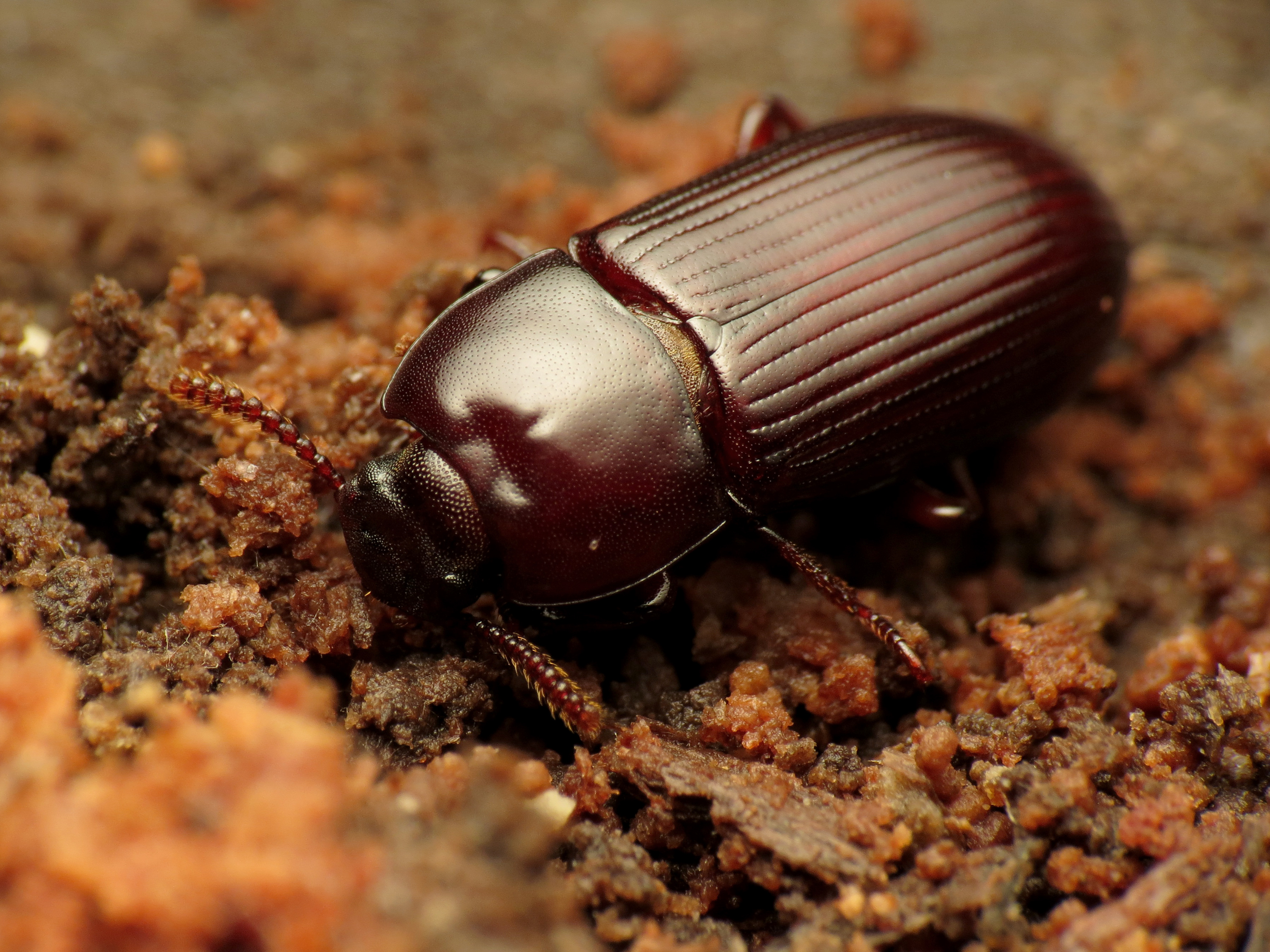
