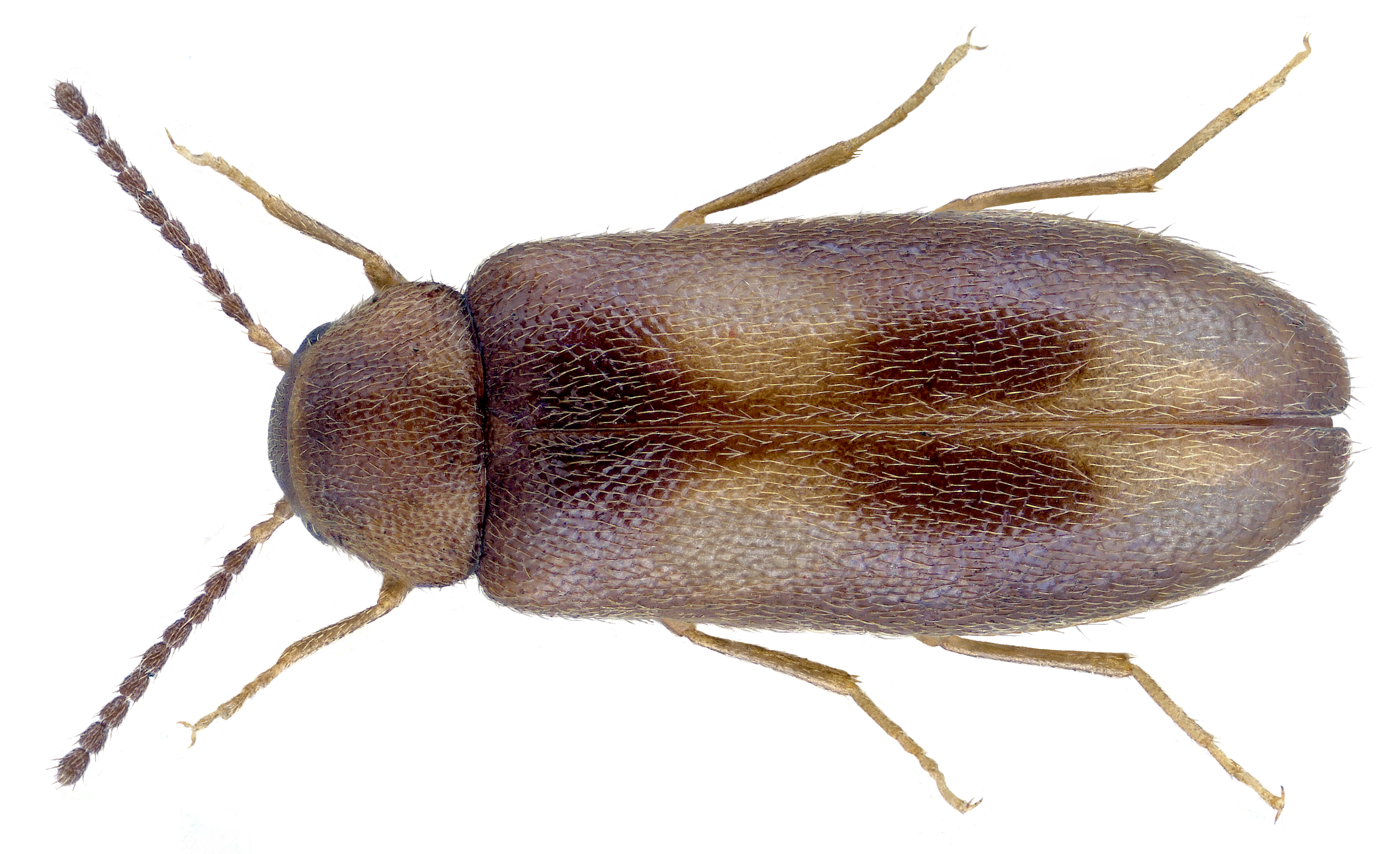

Scientific classification
- Kingdom: Animalia
- Phylum: Arthropoda
- Class: Insecta
- Order: Coleoptera
- Suborder: Polyphaga
- Infraorder: Cucujiformia
- Family: Melandryidae
- Genus: Abdera
- Species: A. triguttata

Binomial name
- Abdera triguttata (Gyllenhal, 1810)

= Abdera triguttata =

Species of beetle

Abdera triguttata is a species of beetle belonging to the family Melandryidae.

It is native to Europe.
