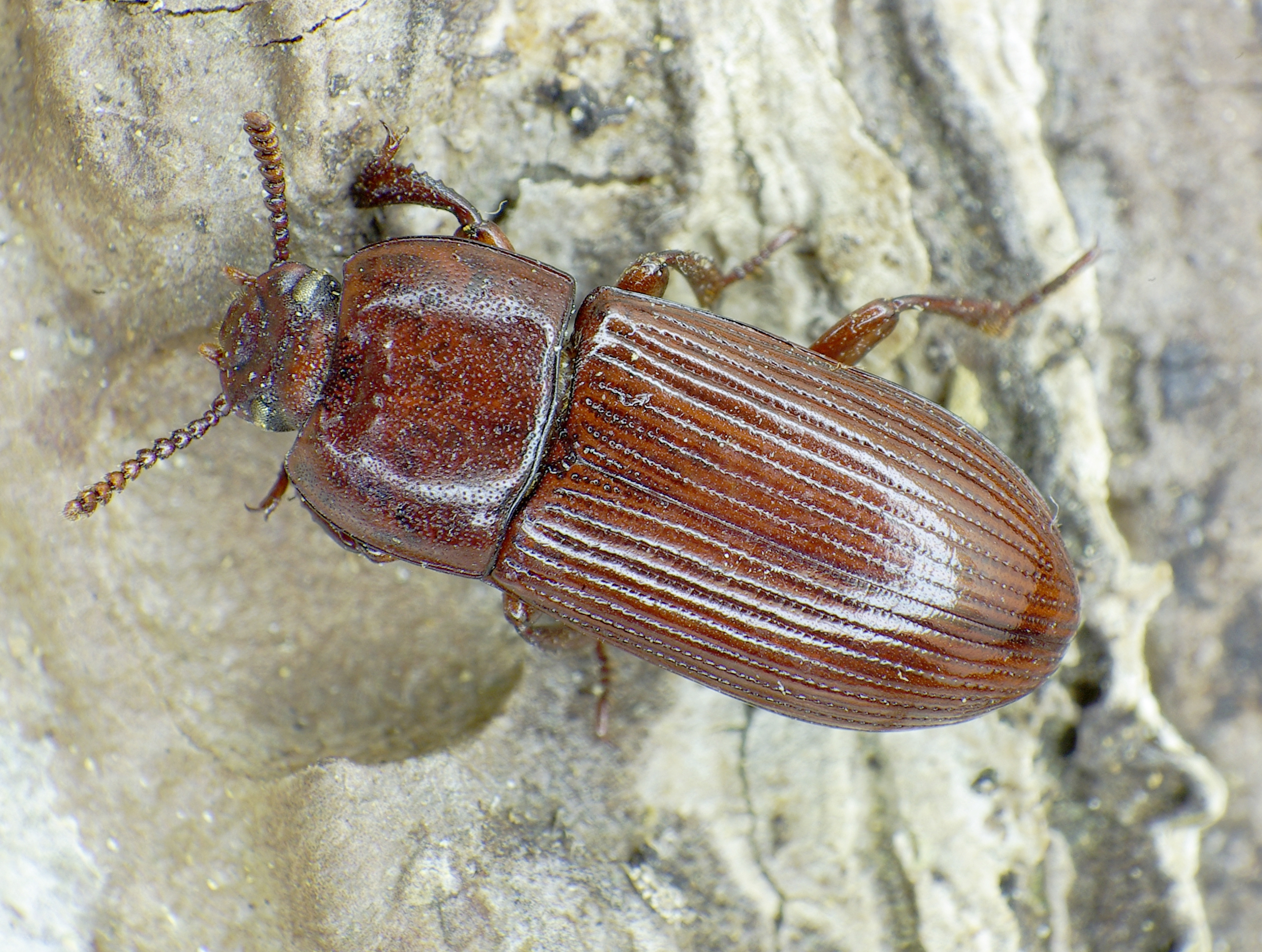

Scientific classification
- Kingdom: Animalia
- Phylum: Arthropoda
- Class: Insecta
- Order: Coleoptera
- Suborder: Polyphaga
- Infraorder: Cucujiformia
- Family: Tenebrionidae
- Genus: Uloma
- Species: U. culinaris

Binomial name
- Uloma culinaris (Linnaeus, 1758)

= Uloma culinaris =

Species of beetle

Uloma culinaris is a species of darkling beetle. It is native to Eurasia.
