= Eutermicola =

Eutermicola sculpticollis

Scientific classification
- Kingdom: Animalia
- Phylum: Arthropoda
- Class: Insecta
- Order: Coleoptera
- Suborder: Polyphaga
- Infraorder: Cucujiformia
- Family: Tenebrionidae
- Subfamily: Tenebrioninae
- Genus: Eutermicola; Lea, 1916
- Species: E. sculpticollis

Binomial name
- Eutermicola sculpticollis Lea, 1916

Species of beetle

Eutermicola sculpticollis is a species of beetles in the family Tenebrionidae, the only species in the genus Eutermicola.
