= Mordellistena pumila =

Scientific classification
- Kingdom: Animalia
- Phylum: Arthropoda
- Class: Insecta
- Order: Coleoptera
- Suborder: Polyphaga
- Infraorder: Cucujiformia
- Family: Mordellidae
- Genus: Mordella
- Species: M. elongata

Binomial name
- Mordella elongata Gyllenhal, 1810

Synonyms
- Mordella elongata Kraatz, 1868; Mordellistena stricta Costa, 1854

Species of beetle

Mordellistena pumila is a species of beetle in the genus Mordellistena of the family Mordellidae. It was described by Gyllenhal in 1810 and can be found everywhere in Europe.
