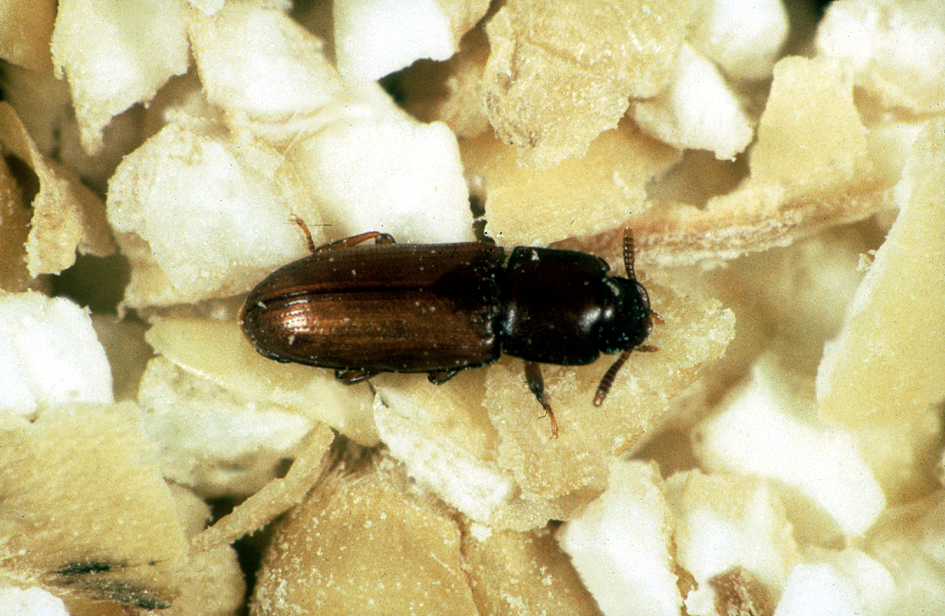

Scientific classification
- Domain: Eukaryota
- Kingdom: Animalia
- Phylum: Arthropoda
- Class: Insecta
- Order: Coleoptera
- Suborder: Polyphaga
- Infraorder: Cucujiformia
- Family: Tenebrionidae
- Genus: Palorus
- Species: P. ratzeburgii

Binomial name
- Palorus ratzeburgii (Wissmann, 1848)

= Palorus ratzeburgii =

Species of beetle

Palorus ratzeburgii, the small-eyed flour beetle, is a species of darkling beetle in the family Tenebrionidae.
