= Cis festivus =

Scientific classification
- Kingdom: Animalia
- Phylum: Arthropoda
- Clade: Pancrustacea
- Class: Insecta
- Order: Coleoptera
- Suborder: Polyphaga
- Infraorder: Cucujiformia
- Family: Ciidae
- Subfamily: Ciinae
- Genus: Cis
- Species: C. festivus

Binomial name
- Cis festivus (Panzer, 1793)

Synonyms
- Anobium festivus Panzer, 1793

Species of beetle

Cis rotundulus is a species of minute tree-fungus beetle in the family Ciidae. It is found in western Europe.
