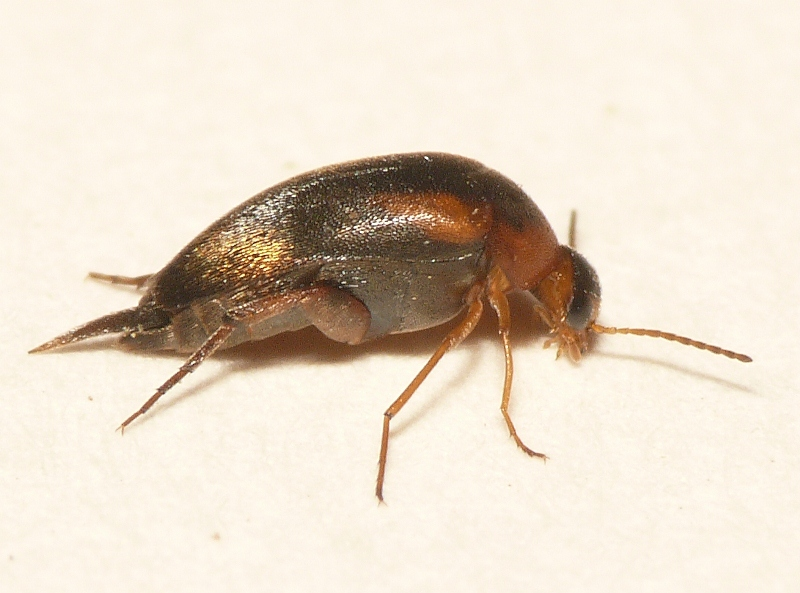

Scientific classification
- Kingdom: Animalia
- Phylum: Arthropoda
- Clade: Pancrustacea
- Class: Insecta
- Order: Coleoptera
- Suborder: Polyphaga
- Infraorder: Cucujiformia
- Family: Mordellidae
- Genus: Mordellistena
- Species: M. variegata

Binomial name
- Mordellistena variegata (Fabricius, 1798)

Synonyms
- Mordellistena lateralis (Olivier, 1795); Mordellistena bicolor Horák, 1982

= Mordellistena variegata =

Species of beetle

Mordellistena variegata, the tumbling flower beetle, is a species of beetle in the genus Mordellistena in the family Mordellidae. It was described by Johan Christian Fabricius in 1798.

== Distribution ==
The species can be found in the following European territories: Austria, Great Britain including the Isle of Man, Bulgaria, Czech Republic, Germany, Hungary, Italy, Poland, Slovakia, Slovenia, Spain, Switzerland, the Netherlands, Ukraine, and southern part of Russia.
