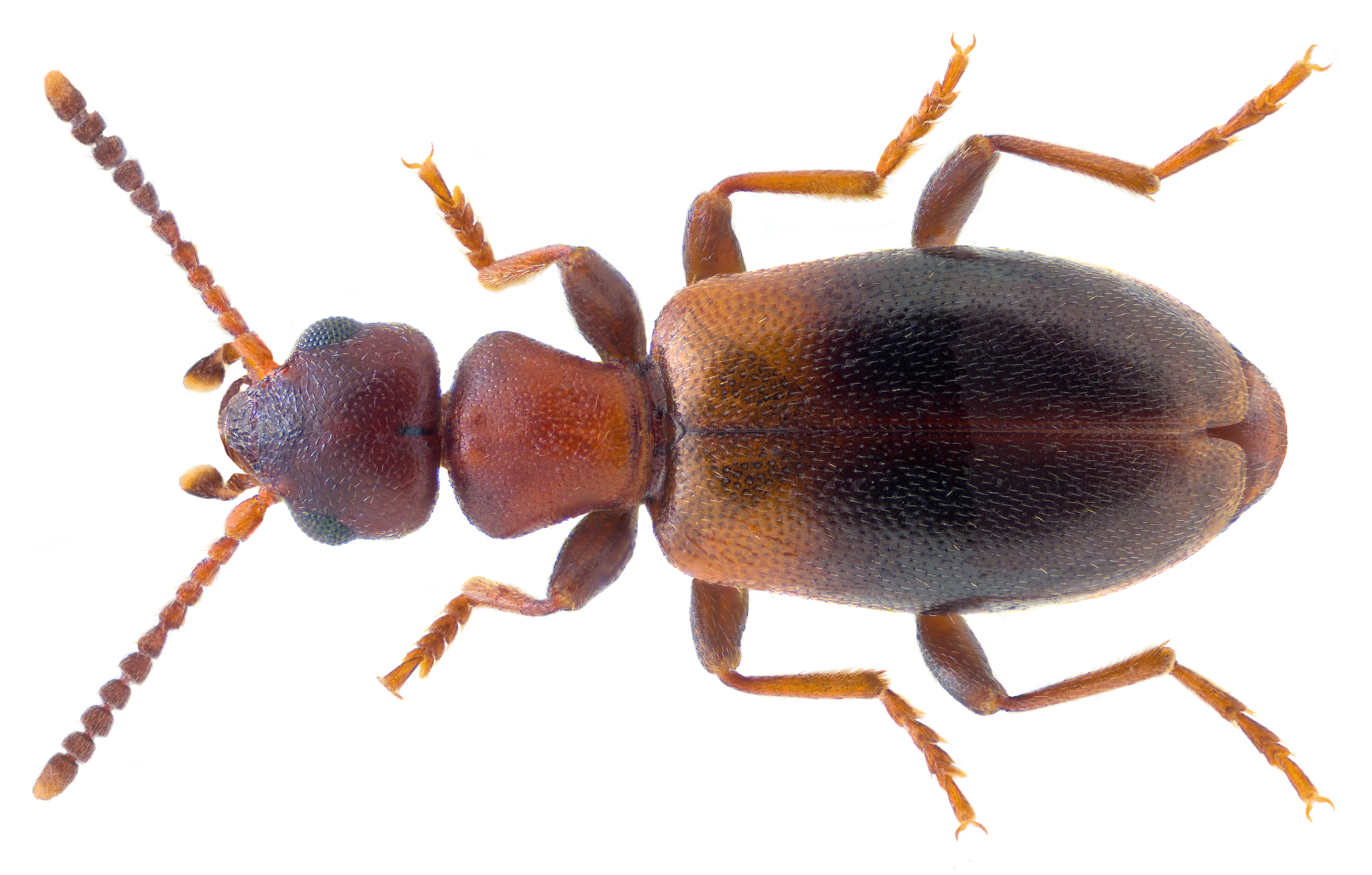

Scientific classification
- Kingdom: Animalia
- Phylum: Arthropoda
- Class: Insecta
- Order: Coleoptera
- Suborder: Polyphaga
- Infraorder: Cucujiformia
- Family: Anthicidae
- Genus: Omonadus
- Species: O. floralis

Binomial name
- Omonadus floralis (Linnaeus, 1758)

Synonyms
- Omonadus basillaris Say, 1824; Omonadus breviculus Philippi, 1864; Omonadus semirufus Fairmaire and Germain, 1860

= Omonadus floralis =

Species of beetle

Omonadus floralis, known generally as the narrow-necked grain beetle or predator beetle, is a species of antlike flower beetle in the family Anthicidae. It is found in the Caribbean, Central America, North America, Oceania, and South America.

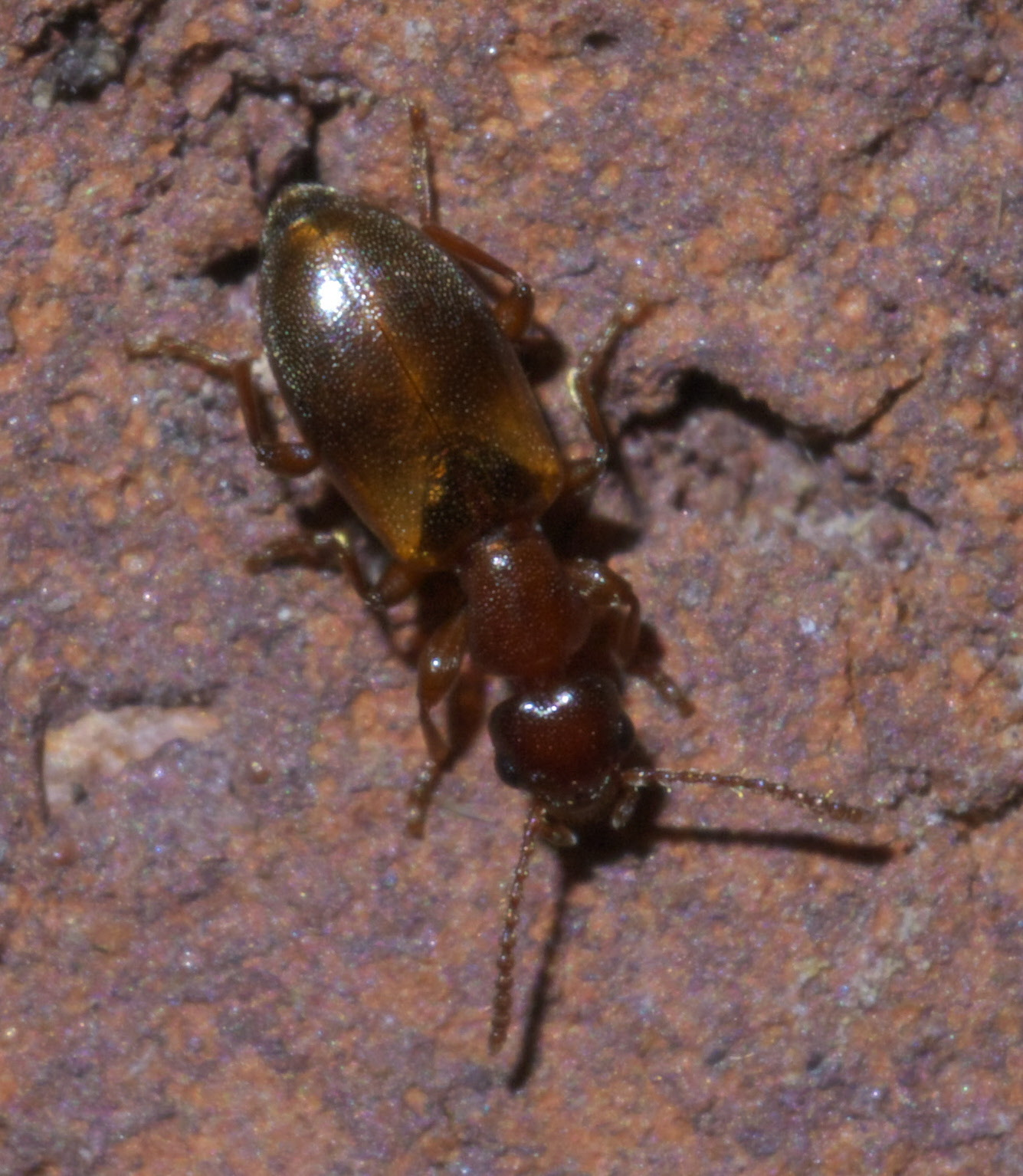
Narrow-necked grain beetle, Omonadus floralis
