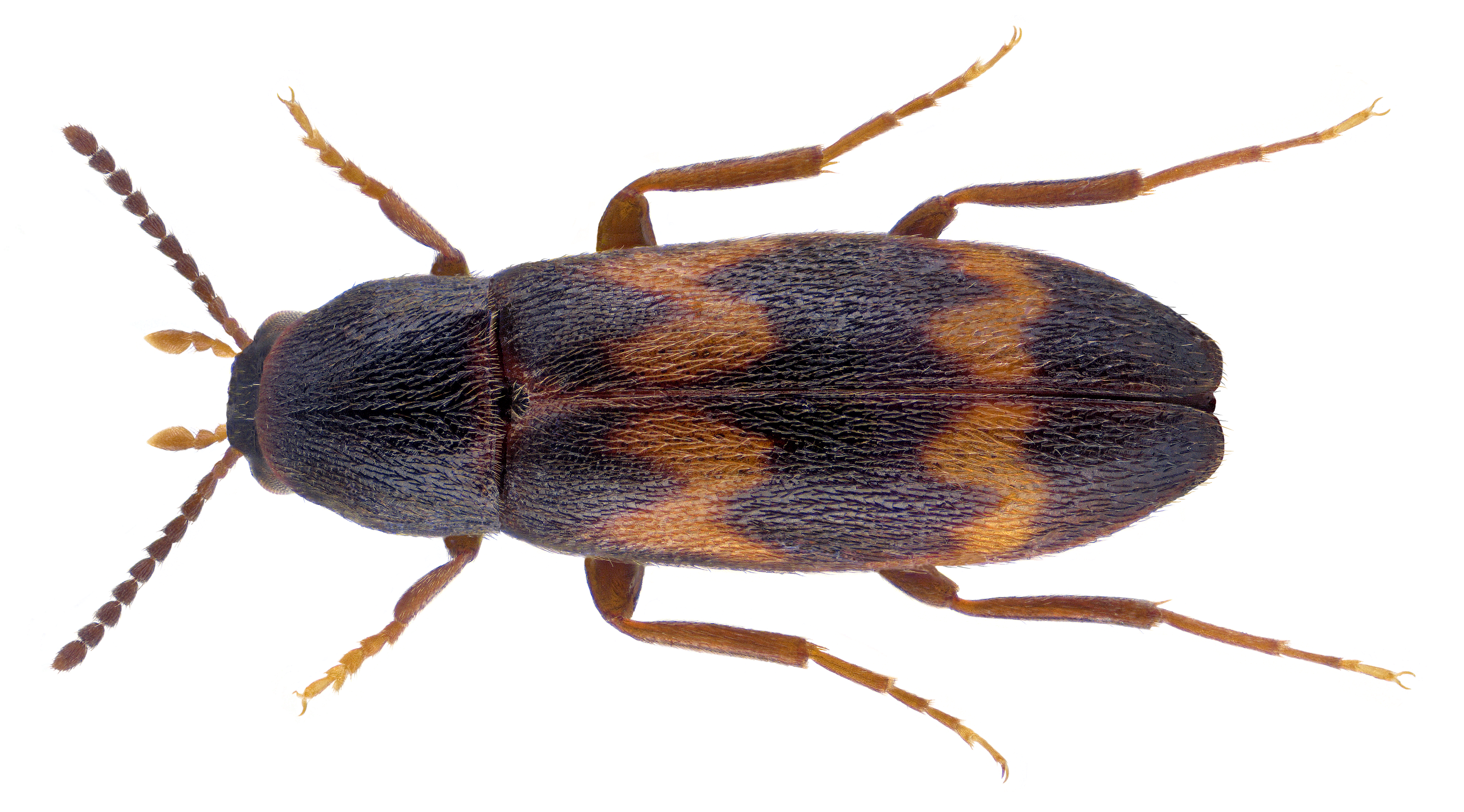
- Abdera biflexuosa

Scientific classification
- Kingdom: Animalia
- Phylum: Arthropoda
- Class: Insecta
- Order: Coleoptera
- Suborder: Polyphaga
- Infraorder: Cucujiformia
- Family: Melandryidae
- Genus: Abdera
- Species: A. biflexuosa

Binomial name
- Abdera biflexuosa (Curtis, 1829)

Synonyms
- Abdera bifasciata Marsham, 1802; Abdera undata (Perris, 1852); Adobia mulsanti Nikitsky, 2008; Dircaea griseoguttata Fairmaire, 1849; Dircaea undata Perris, 1852; Elater flexuosus Olivier, 1790; Hypulus biflexuosa Curtis, 1829; Mordella bifasciata Marsham, 1802

= Abdera biflexuosa =

Species of beetles

Abdera biflexuosa is a species of false darkling beetle in the family Melandryidae. It is found in Europe.
