= Mordellistena pseudoparvula =

Scientific classification
- Domain: Eukaryota
- Kingdom: Animalia
- Phylum: Arthropoda
- Class: Insecta
- Order: Coleoptera
- Suborder: Polyphaga
- Infraorder: Cucujiformia
- Family: Mordellidae
- Subfamily: Mordellinae
- Tribe: Mordellistenini
- Genus: Mordellistena
- Species: M. pseudoparvula

Binomial name
- Mordellistena pseudoparvula Ermisch, 1956

Synonyms
- Mordellistena eludens Allen, 1999; Mordellistena parvuloides Ermisch, 1956

Species of beetle

Mordellistena pseudoparvula is a species of beetle in the genus Mordellistena of the family Mordellidae. It was described by Ermisch in 1977.
