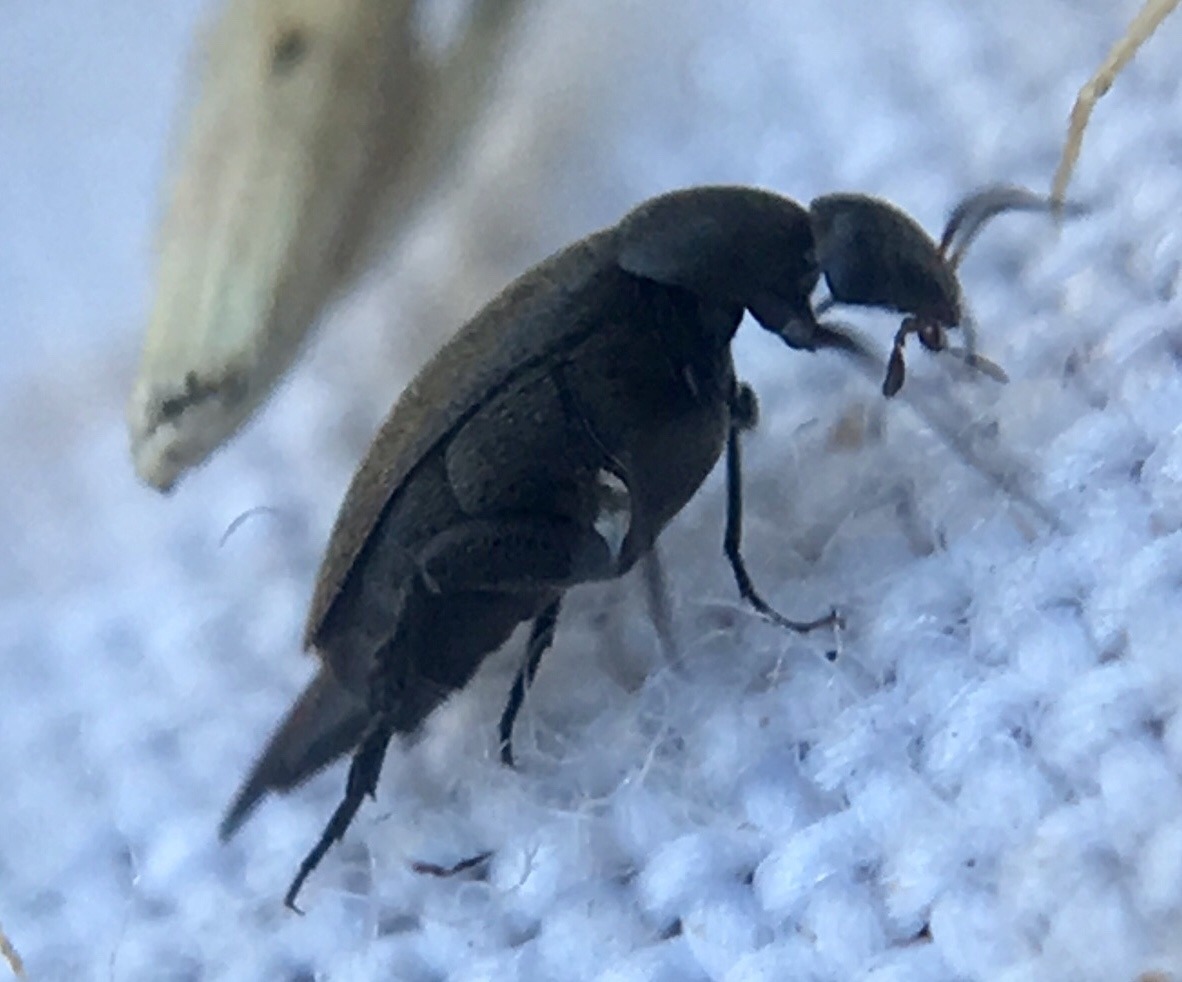

Scientific classification
- Kingdom: Animalia
- Phylum: Arthropoda
- Class: Insecta
- Order: Coleoptera
- Suborder: Polyphaga
- Infraorder: Cucujiformia
- Family: Mordellidae
- Genus: Mordella
- Species: M. pusilla

Binomial name
- Mordella pusilla (Gyllenhal, 1827)

Synonyms
- List: Mordella parvula Gyllenhal, 1827; Mordella pusilla Redtenbacher, 1849; Mordella troglodytes Mannerheim, 1844; Mordellistena liliputana Mulsant, 1856; Mordellistena rectangula Roubal, 1911

= Mordellistena parvula =

Species of beetle

Mordellistena parvula is a species of beetle in the family Mordellidae. It was described by Gyllenhal in 1827 and can be found in Albania, Bosnia and Herzegovina, Bulgaria, Czech Republic, Germany, Hungary, Italy and North Macedonia.
