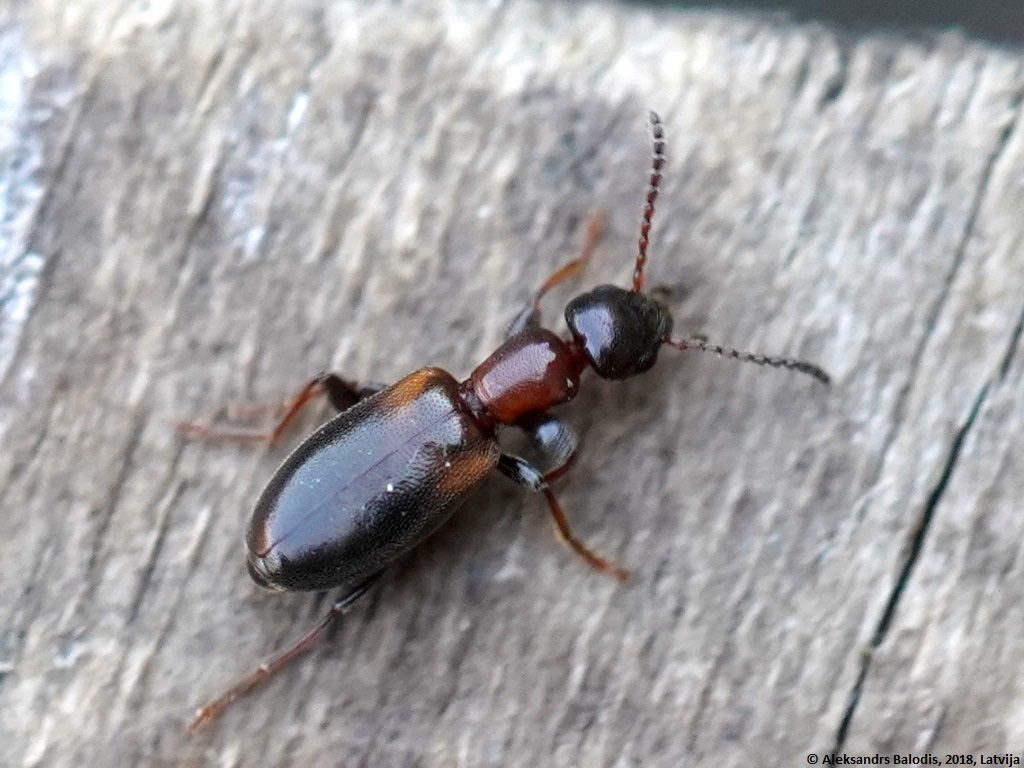

Scientific classification
- Kingdom: Animalia
- Phylum: Arthropoda
- Clade: Pancrustacea
- Class: Insecta
- Order: Coleoptera
- Suborder: Polyphaga
- Infraorder: Cucujiformia
- Family: Anthicidae
- Genus: Omonadus
- Species: O. formicarius

Binomial name
- Omonadus formicarius (Goeze, 1777)

Synonyms
- Omonadus enodis Casey, 1895; Omonadus quisquilius Thomson, 1864; Omonadus rixator Casey, 1895; Omonadus scenicus Casey, 1895

= Omonadus formicarius =

Species of beetle

Omonadus formicarius is a species of antlike flower beetle in the family Anthicidae. It is found in the Caribbean, Central America, North America, Oceania, South America, and Europe.
