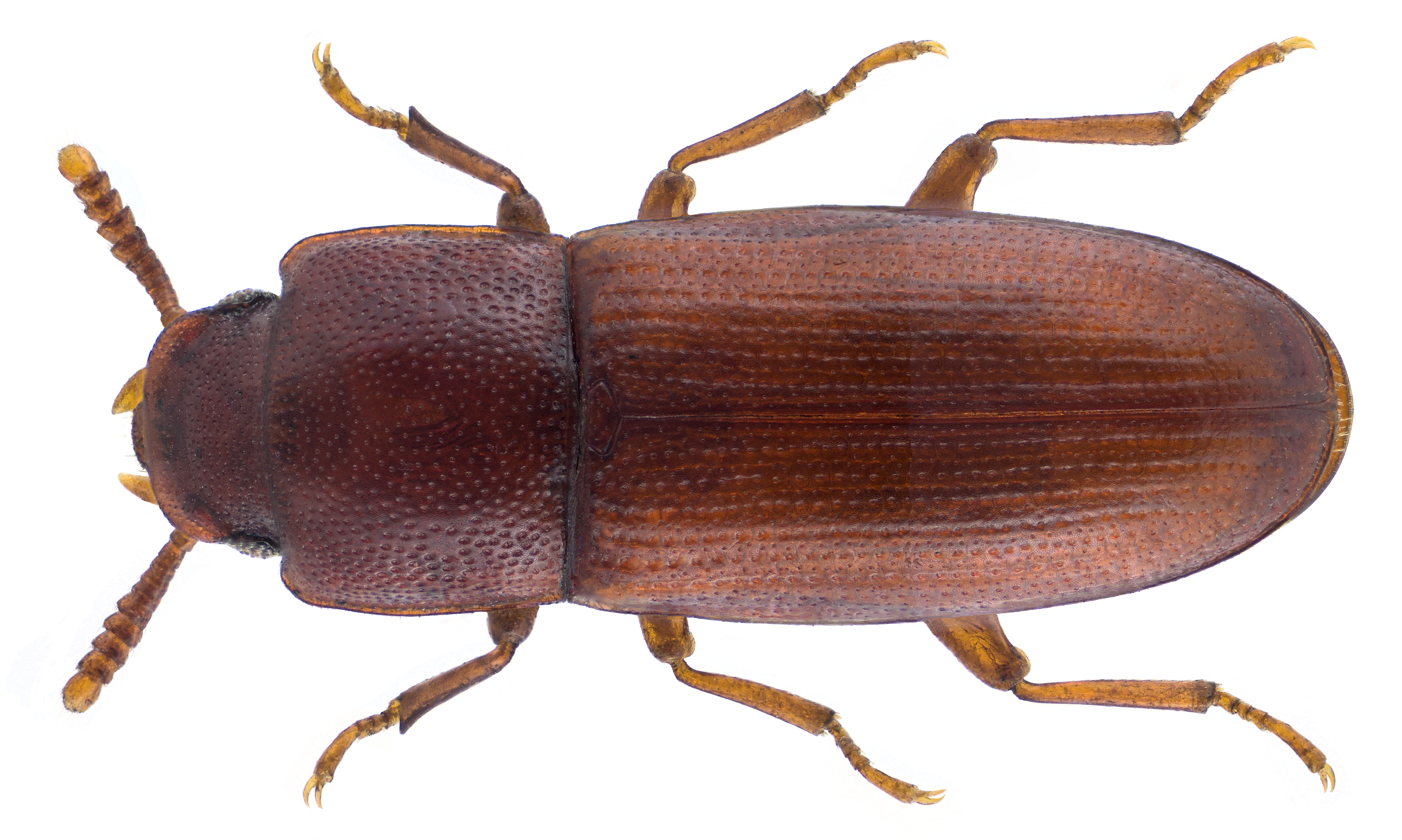

Scientific classification
- Domain: Eukaryota
- Kingdom: Animalia
- Phylum: Arthropoda
- Class: Insecta
- Order: Coleoptera
- Suborder: Polyphaga
- Infraorder: Cucujiformia
- Family: Tenebrionidae
- Genus: Palorus
- Species: P. subdepressus

Binomial name
- Palorus subdepressus (Wollaston, 1864)

= Palorus subdepressus =

Species of beetle

Palorus subdepressus, the depressed flour beetle, is a species of darkling beetle in the family Tenebrionidae. It is found in Europe and North America.
