= Mordellistena brevicauda =

Scientific classification
- Domain: Eukaryota
- Kingdom: Animalia
- Phylum: Arthropoda
- Class: Insecta
- Order: Coleoptera
- Suborder: Polyphaga
- Infraorder: Cucujiformia
- Family: Mordellidae
- Genus: Mordellistena
- Species: M. brevicauda

Binomial name
- Mordellistena brevicauda (Boheman, 1849)

Synonyms
- Mordella brevicauda Boheman, 1849; Mordellistena brevicornis Schilsky, 1895; Mordellistena obtusa Brisoult, 1859; Mordellistena subtruncata Mulsant, 1856

Species of beetle

Mordellistena brevicauda is a beetle in the genus Mordellistena of the family Mordellidae. It was described in 1849 by Carl Henrik Boheman.
