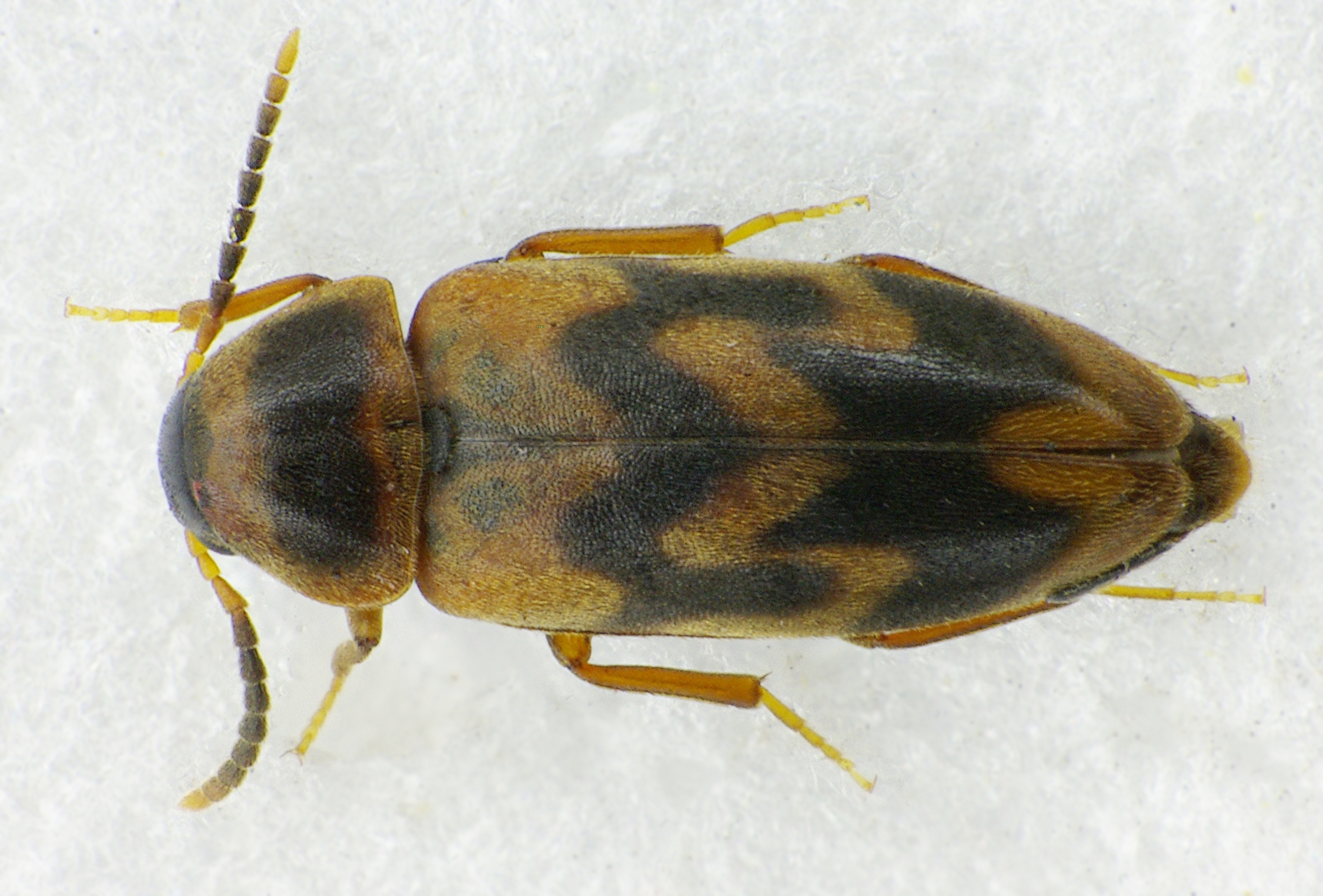
- Abdera flexuosa

Scientific classification
- Domain: Eukaryota
- Kingdom: Animalia
- Phylum: Arthropoda
- Class: Insecta
- Order: Coleoptera
- Suborder: Polyphaga
- Infraorder: Cucujiformia
- Family: Melandryidae
- Subfamily: Melandryinae
- Tribe: Dircaeini
- Genus: Abdera; Stephens, 1832

Species
- See text

Synonyms
- Adobia Mulsant, 1856; Carida Mulsant, 1856; Caridua Strand, 1929; Hypulus Curtis, 1829

= Abdera (beetle) =

Genus of beetles

Abdera is a genus of false darkling beetles, in the family Melandryidae. It contains three species, two of which are extinct and were discovered in 2014.

== Species ==
- Abdera affinis (Paykull, 1799)
- Abdera biflexuosa (Curtis, 1829)
- Abdera firma Hatch, 1962
- Abdera flexuosa (Paykull, 1799)
- †Abdera hoffeinsorum Alekseev, 2014
- Abdera quadrifasciata (Curtis, 1829)
- †Abdera rikojotensis Alekseev, 2014
- Abdera spec (Paykull, 1799)
