= M. occultus =

M. occultus may refer to:

- Mecyclothorax occultus, a species of beetle
- Meloe occultus, a species of beetle
- Mesomys occultus, a species of rodent
- Mughiphantes occultus, a species of spider in the genus Mughiphantes
- Myotis occultus, a species of bat
