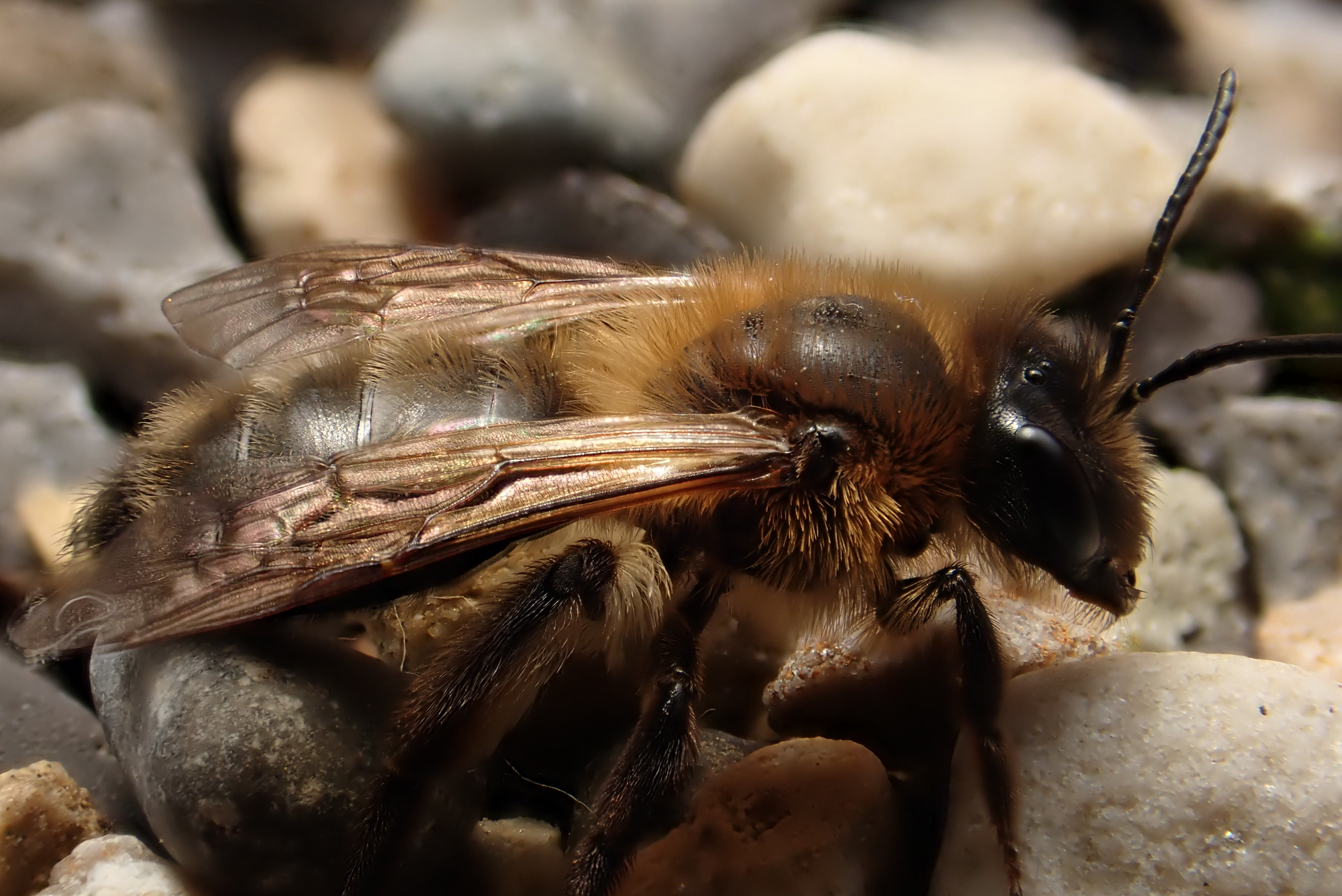

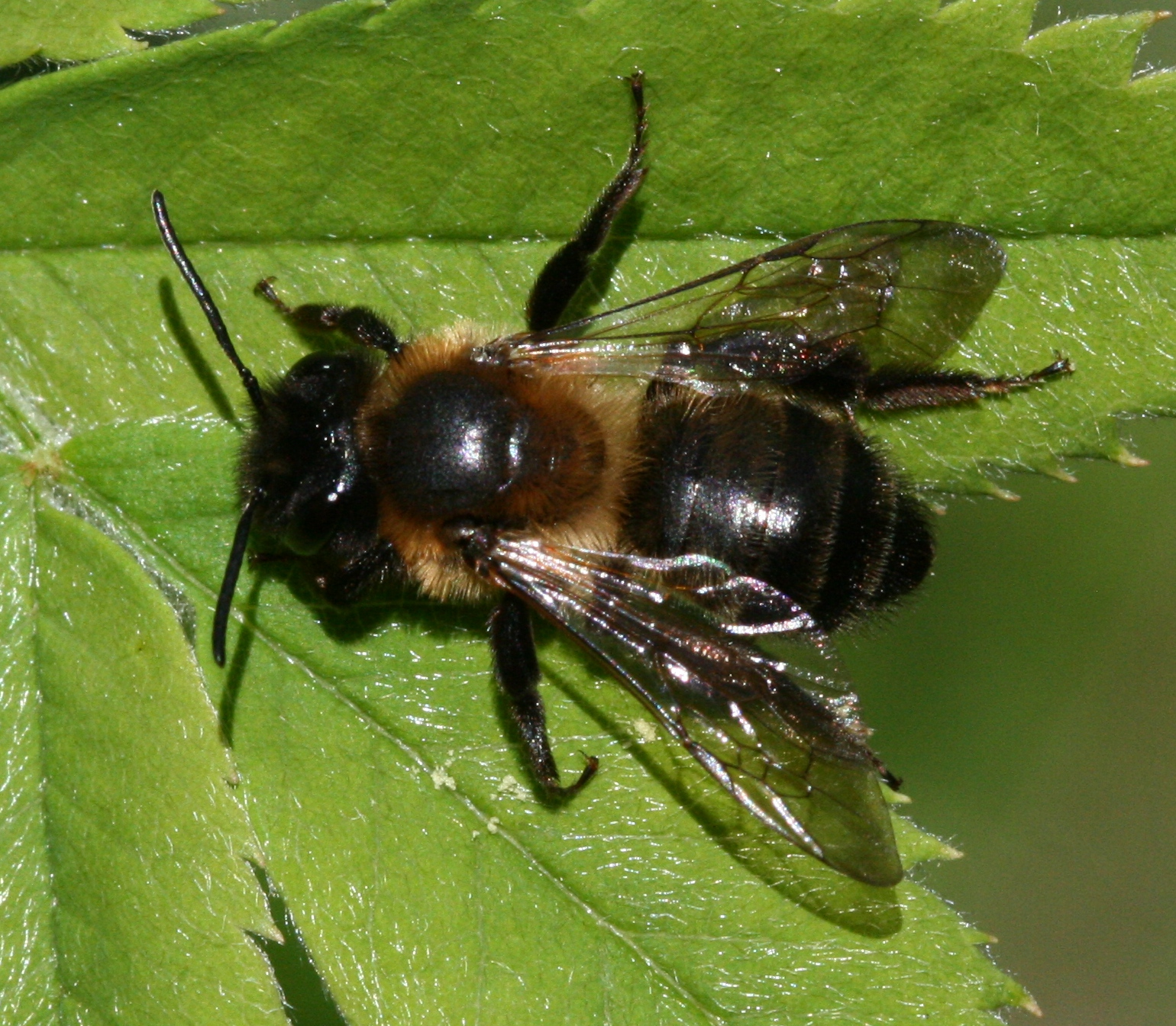

Scientific classification
- Kingdom: Animalia
- Phylum: Arthropoda
- Class: Insecta
- Order: Hymenoptera
- Family: Andrenidae
- Genus: Andrena
- Species: A. scotica

Binomial name
- Andrena scotica Perkins, 1916

Synonyms
- Andrena jacobi Perkins 1921

= Andrena scotica =

Species of bee

Andrena scotica, the chocolate mining bee or hawthorn bee, is a species of mining bee from the family Andrenidae. It occurs in western Europe and is one of the most frequently encountered mining bees found in Great Britain, where it had been previously misidentified as Andrena carantonica.

== Description ==
Andrena scotica females are similar in size to a honey bee (Apis mellifera), larger than most of its congeners. They possess very small pollen baskets or flocci on their hind legs and the long, pale scopae are dark on distally and curly proximally. They have a covering of fine brown to orange hairs, which is denser on the thorax, with face being the same colour. There is a fine covering of shorter hairs on the abdomen and the hind tibia is dark. Northern populations of A. scotica tend to be more extensively dark-haired than the southern populations. The smaller males have a wholly black abdomen too. There is an apical tooth on the mandibles but the cheeks normally lack a spine. As well as being smaller than the females they are also comparatively slender. A. scotica measures between 10 and 14 mm in length.

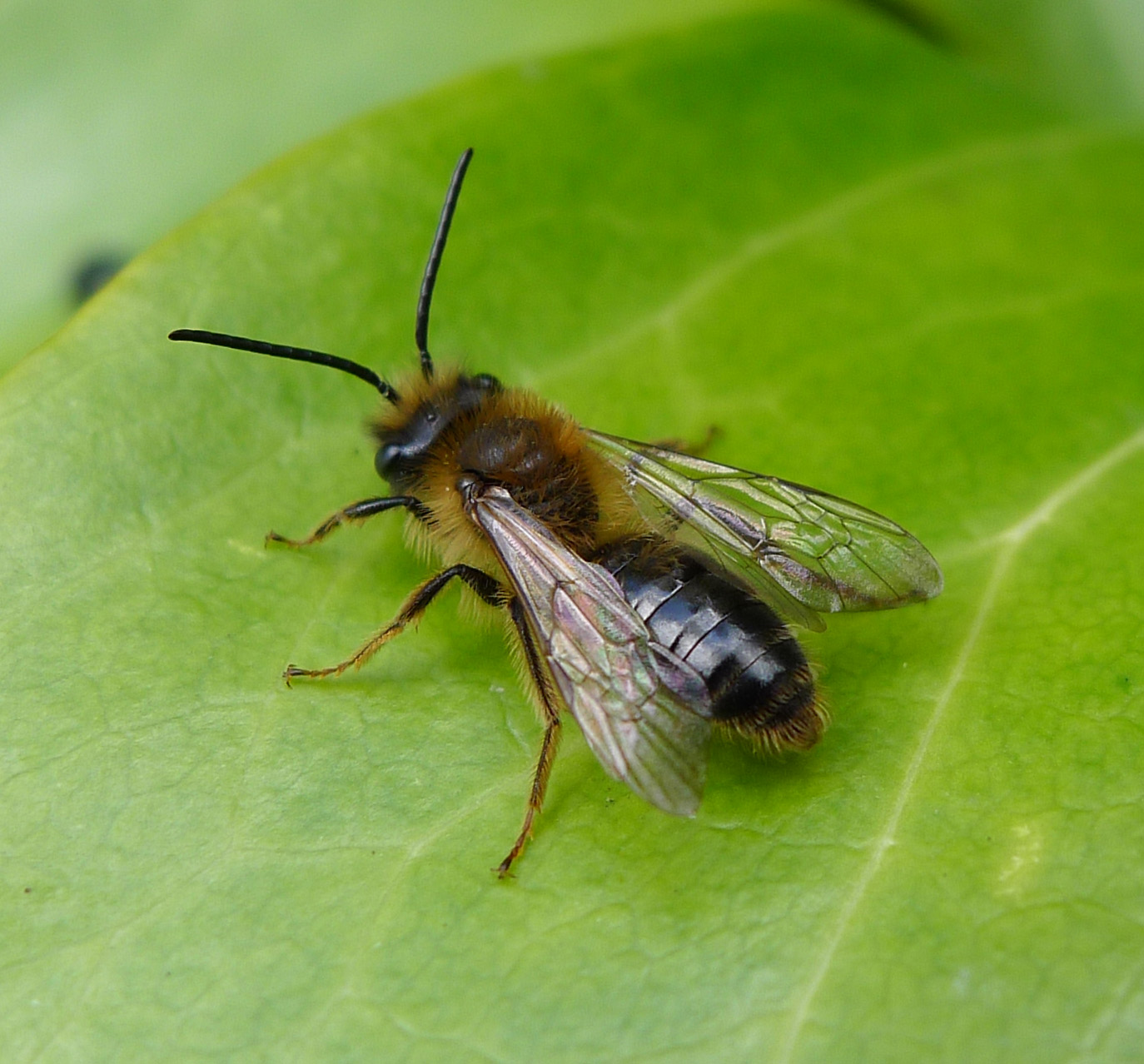
male

== Distribution ==
Andrena scotica is endemic to Europe where it is found in Ireland east to Poland and the Czech Republic, south to Italy and north to southern Scandinavia and Finland.

== Habitat ==
Andrena scotica occurs in a wide variety of habitats, especially where there are firm sandy soils in open situations such as in the vicinity of footpaths. Favoured habitats include parks, gardens and open woodland.

== Biology ==
Andrena scotica is one of the earlier bees to appear and the flight period is mid March to late June with numbers peaking late April and May. The females are facultative communal nesters with a group of them sharing a common entrance to a burrow in which each female tends her own eggs and larvae within a chamber off the main burrow, constructing brood cells within her tunnel and provisioning the cells with pollen and nectar collected from a wide range of flower species. Females will nest singly but normally two or more, and sometimes hundreds of, females will share a single nest entrance. These bees often forage on spring-blossoming shrubs and trees as well as a variety of low-growing flowers. In more southern parts of its distribution there may be a partial second generation in the summer if there is long spell of warm weather. It is polylectic and has been recorded foraging on maples Aceraceae, umbellifers Apiaceae, holly Aquifoliaceae, Asteraceae, crucifers Brassicaceae, dogwoods, Fagaceae, buttercups, roses and willows. It is thought that the offspring complete their development in their brood cells in which they overwinter as fully developed adults before emerging in the following spring through nest entrance. When the adults first emerge they meet each other in and around the burrows and the females are often mated before they can leave it.

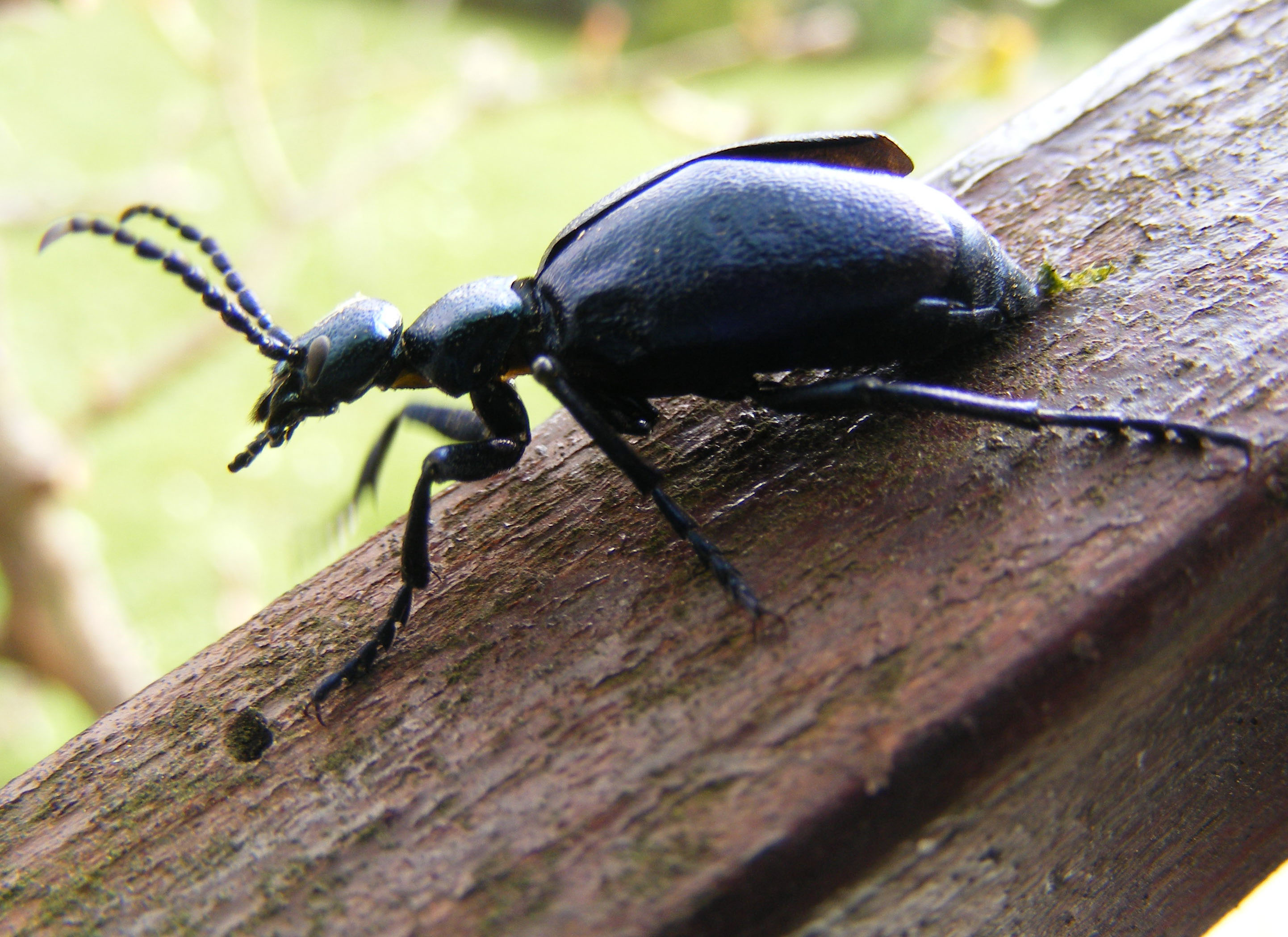
Meloe violaceus, the larvae are cleptoparasites on A. scotica

Females of the parasitic strepsipteran Stylops melittae specialise in parasitising mining bees producing large numbers of larvae on flowers. When the bee forages on the flower for pollen, the larvae attach themselves to the bee. Then, when the bee provisions a nest cell, one or more larval Strepsiptera enter into the larval bee's body and settle in its abdomen. After the larval bee matures, the strepsipteran larvae break through between two of the bee's abdominal segments, pupate while lodged within the host's abdomen, and then the males emerge as imagos and fly off to mate with virgin, still host-resident, females (i.e., the adult females—which have no wings, antennae, or even eyes—never leave the host). Female Strepsiptera release live young when the parasitized bee forages. The larval Strepsiptera must find their own host to begin the life cycle again. In a study on Öland three species of flies were observed at or near the nest entrances of A. scotica or around flowers upon which the female bees were foraging. These were the Conopid Myopa buccata, the bee fly Bombylius major and anthomyiid Leucophora personata. In addition, Myopa testacea, was also recorded as a parasite from sampled A. scotica. Other insects associated with the nests A. scotica include the cuckoo bee Nomada marshamella and the violet oil beetle (Meloe violaceus), the larvae of which attach themselves to foraging bees when they land on flowers and are transported by the bee into the cell where the consume the contents of the cell, including the eggs of the bee.

== Taxonomy ==
There is some controversy over the naming of Andrena scotica, it was known as Andrena carantonica. This name was applied by the Italian entomologist Perez to specimens he collected near Bordeaux and then applied to similar bees collected elsewhere. On investigation it was found that A. carontonica is not the same species as A. scotica as described by Perkins, but is more likely a synonym of Andrena trimmerana. Bordeaux falls outside of the known range of A. scotica and the specimen was taken too late in the summer for that species. A scotica and A. trimmerana are sympatric in England. DNA analysis has confirmed that there are two different types, with one being present in Germany and France and the other in northern England and Sweden. Examination of the type of A. carantonica, has probably confirmed A. scotica as a separate species from A. carantonica which is almost certainly a junior synonym of A. trimmerana.
