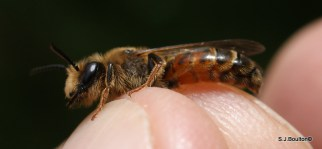

Scientific classification
- Domain: Eukaryota
- Kingdom: Animalia
- Phylum: Arthropoda
- Class: Insecta
- Order: Hymenoptera
- Family: Andrenidae
- Genus: Andrena
- Species: A. trimmerana

Binomial name
- Andrena trimmerana Kirby, 1802

Synonyms
- Melitta trimmerana Kirby, 1802; Melitta spinigera Kirby, 1802; Andrena fusca Lepeletier, 1841; Andrena arietina Dours, 1872; Andrena ustulata Dours, 1872; Andrena lombardica Schmiedeknecht, 1883; Andrena dragona Friese, 1887; Andrena carantonica Perez, 1902; Andrena anglica Alfken, 1911

= Andrena trimmerana =

Species of bee

Andrena trimmerana, Trimmer's mining bee, is a species of mining bee from the family Andrenidae. It occurs in the western Palearctic but its true status in some areas is muddled due to issues of taxonomy and misidentification.

== Description ==
Andrena trimmerana is bivoltine and the broods differ from each other in morphology, especially the male bees. They are difficult to separate from the closely related and partially sympatric A. scotica. The females of A. trimmerana can be separated from females of A. scotica by the red patches of colour on the sides of tergite 1 and the reddish colour of the basal sternites. This reddish colour on the basal sternites is similar to A. bimaculata but A. trimmerana is larger and is rougher on the top of the propodeum. The later, summer generation of A. rosae also resembles A. trimmerana but it has shorter hairs all over its body. They measure 13-15mm in length.

The early brood or spring generation males possess a spine on their genae which is of variable size, this is also present in the males of the spring generation of A. rosae but they have an all dark abdomen and lack an apical tooth on their mandibles, while the males of A. ferox also have a genal spine but can be identified by having yellow hind tibiae.

== Distribution ==
Andrena trimmerana is found in the southern part of the western Palearctic from southern Great Britain south through the Mediterranean islands to North Africa and east through France and Central Europe to Turkey and western Russia.

== Habitat ==
Andrena timmerana is a generalist which occurs across many habitats including landslips and cliffs in coastal areas and heaths, open woodland, chalk grassland, fens, pastures and gardens in inland areas, as well as brownfield sites and occasionally urban greenspace.

== Biology ==
Andrena timmerania has two generations each year, i.e. it is bivoltine, one in the Spring which flies from mid March to the end of April and the other in the summer from July to late September. It does not nest communally and the females dig nesting burrows in banks, slopes and vertical banks of soil. It is polylectic and has been recorded foraging on buttercups, willows, bramble, rhododendron, blackthorn, gorse, alexanders and dandelion. The spring generation appear to prefer willows and Prunus spp while the summer generation shows a preference for brambles and umbellifers.

== Taxonomy ==
The second Andrena timmerana generation has been proposed as a separate species Andrena spinigera or has been identified as Andrena carantonica. The name Andrena carantonica was applied by the Italian entomologist Perez to specimens he collected near Bordeaux and was then applied to similar bees collected elsewhere. Later investigations found that A. carontonica is most likely a junior synonym of Andrena trimmerana. The closely related A. scotica has been misidentified as A. carontonica and there is work still to be done to determine the limits of both species.
