= Megachile pruinosa =

Scientific classification
- Domain: Eukaryota
- Kingdom: Animalia
- Phylum: Arthropoda
- Class: Insecta
- Order: Hymenoptera
- Family: Megachilidae
- Genus: Megachile
- Species: M. pruinosa

Binomial name
- Megachile pruinosa Pérez, 1897

Species of leafcutter bee (Megachile)

Megachile pruinosa is a species of bee in the family Megachilidae. It was described by Pérez in 1897.
