= Megachile crassula =

Scientific classification
- Domain: Eukaryota
- Kingdom: Animalia
- Phylum: Arthropoda
- Class: Insecta
- Order: Hymenoptera
- Family: Megachilidae
- Genus: Megachile
- Species: M. crassula

Binomial name
- Megachile crassula Pérez, 1896

Species of leafcutter bee (Megachile)

Megachile crassula is a species of bee in the family Megachilidae. It was described by Pérez in 1896.
