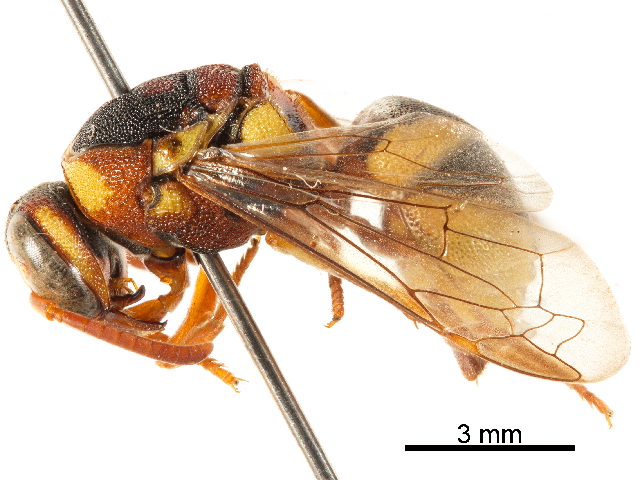
- Knemodynerus rhynchoides inclinans

Scientific classification
- Domain: Eukaryota
- Kingdom: Animalia
- Phylum: Arthropoda
- Class: Insecta
- Order: Hymenoptera
- Family: Vespidae
- Subfamily: Eumeninae
- Genus: Knemodynerus; Blüthgen, 1940

Type species
- Odynerus excellens Pérez, 1907

Species
- See text

= Knemodynerus =

Genus of insects

Knemodynerus is a genus of potter wasps distributed through the Palearctic, Afrotropical, Indomalayan and Australasian regions. The species currently classified in the genus are:

- Knemodynerus aequabilis Gusenleitner, 1995
- Knemodynerus albolimbatus Schulthess, 1914
- Knemodynerus australensis (Giordani Soika, 1986)
- Knemodynerus chiengmaiensis Gusenleitner, 1996
- Knemodynerus circumspectus (Smith, 1860)
- Knemodynerus complanatus Giordani Soika, 1995
- Knemodynerus conspicuous Gusenleitner, 1992
- Knemodynerus coriaceus Giordani Soika, 1970
- Knemodynerus dancaliensis (Giordani Soika, 1989)
- Knemodynerus dictatorius (Giordani Soika, 1935)
- Knemodynerus djarabubensis (Schulthess, 1928)
- Knemodynerus euodyneroides Gusenleitner, 1997
- Knemodynerus euryspilus (Cameron, 1910)
- Knemodynerus excellens (Pérez, 1907)
- Knemodynerus expressus (Giordani Soika, 1934)
- Knemodynerus fabulosus (Giordani Soika, 1979)
- Knemodynerus farquharensis (Cameron, 1907)
- Knemodynerus imitatus Gusenleitner, 2010
- Knemodynerus inversus Gusenleitner, 2004
- Knemodynerus lahijensis Gusenleitner, 2002
- Knemodynerus lahorensis (Ahmad & Ahsan, 1976)
- Knemodynerus longitegulae (Williams, 1928)
- Knemodynerus malickyi Gusenleitner, 1995
- Knemodynerus meyeri (Cameron, 1910)
- Knemodynerus nadigorum (Giordani Soika, 1979)
- Knemodynerus polyphemus (Kirby, 1888)
- Knemodynerus pseudocoriaceus Giordani Soika, 1970
- Knemodynerus pseudolateralis (Meade-Waldo, 1915)
- Knemodynerus rhynchoides (Saussure, 1852)
- Knemodynerus seychellensis (Dalla Torre, 1904)
- Knemodynerus sinaiticus (Giordani Soika, 1939)
- Knemodynerus stigma (Saussure, 1863)
- Knemodynerus tanimbarensis Gusenleitner, 2008
- Knemodynerus tectus (Fabricius, 1781
- Knemodynerus turneri (Giordani Soika, 1934)
