= Megachile albipila =

Scientific classification
- Domain: Eukaryota
- Kingdom: Animalia
- Phylum: Arthropoda
- Class: Insecta
- Order: Hymenoptera
- Family: Megachilidae
- Genus: Megachile
- Species: M. albipila

Binomial name
- Megachile albipila Pérez, 1895

Species of leafcutter bee (Megachile)

Megachile albipila is a species of bee in the family Megachilidae. It was described by Theodosio De Stefani Perez in 1895.
