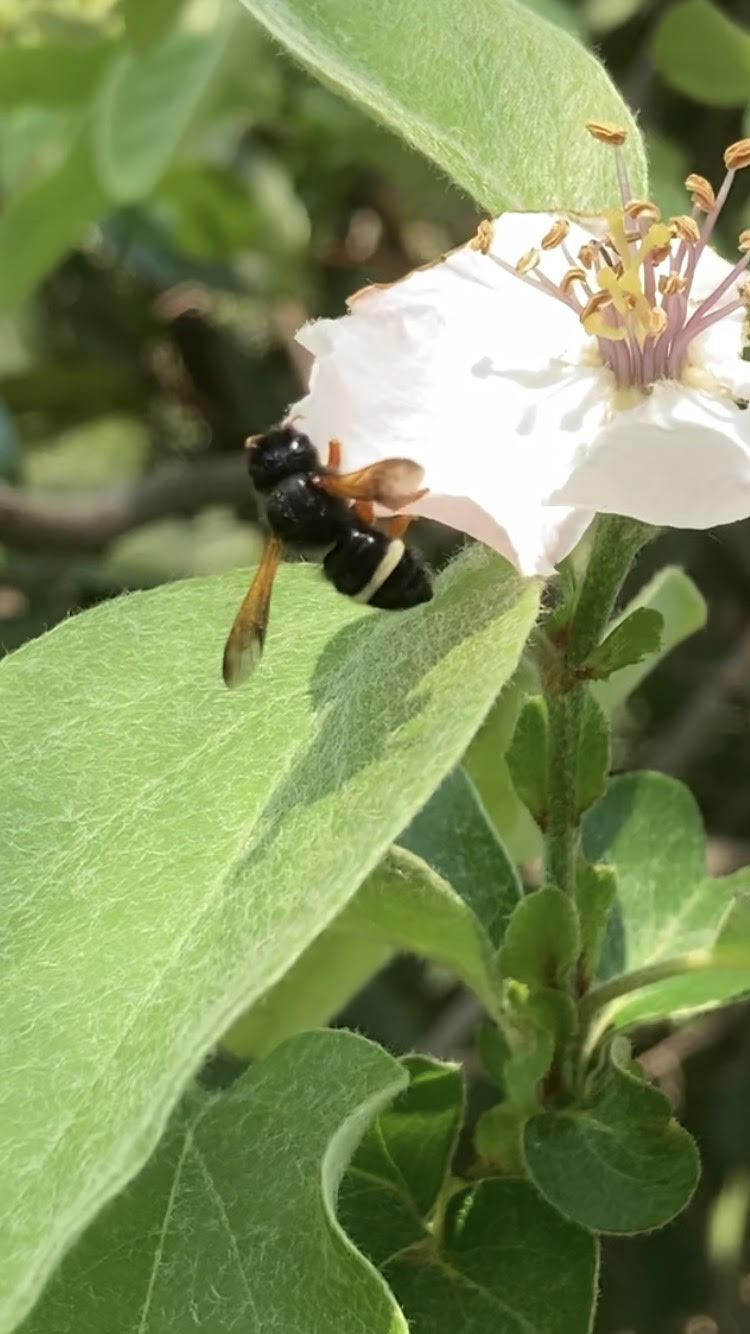
- Megachile euzona in Rinconada, Región de Valparaíso, Chile.

Scientific classification
- Domain: Eukaryota
- Kingdom: Animalia
- Phylum: Arthropoda
- Class: Insecta
- Order: Hymenoptera
- Family: Megachilidae
- Genus: Megachile
- Species: M. euzona

Binomial name
- Megachile euzona Pérez, 1899

= Megachile euzona =

Species of leafcutter bee (Megachile)

Megachile euzona is a species of bee in the family Megachilidae. It was described by Pérez in 1899.
