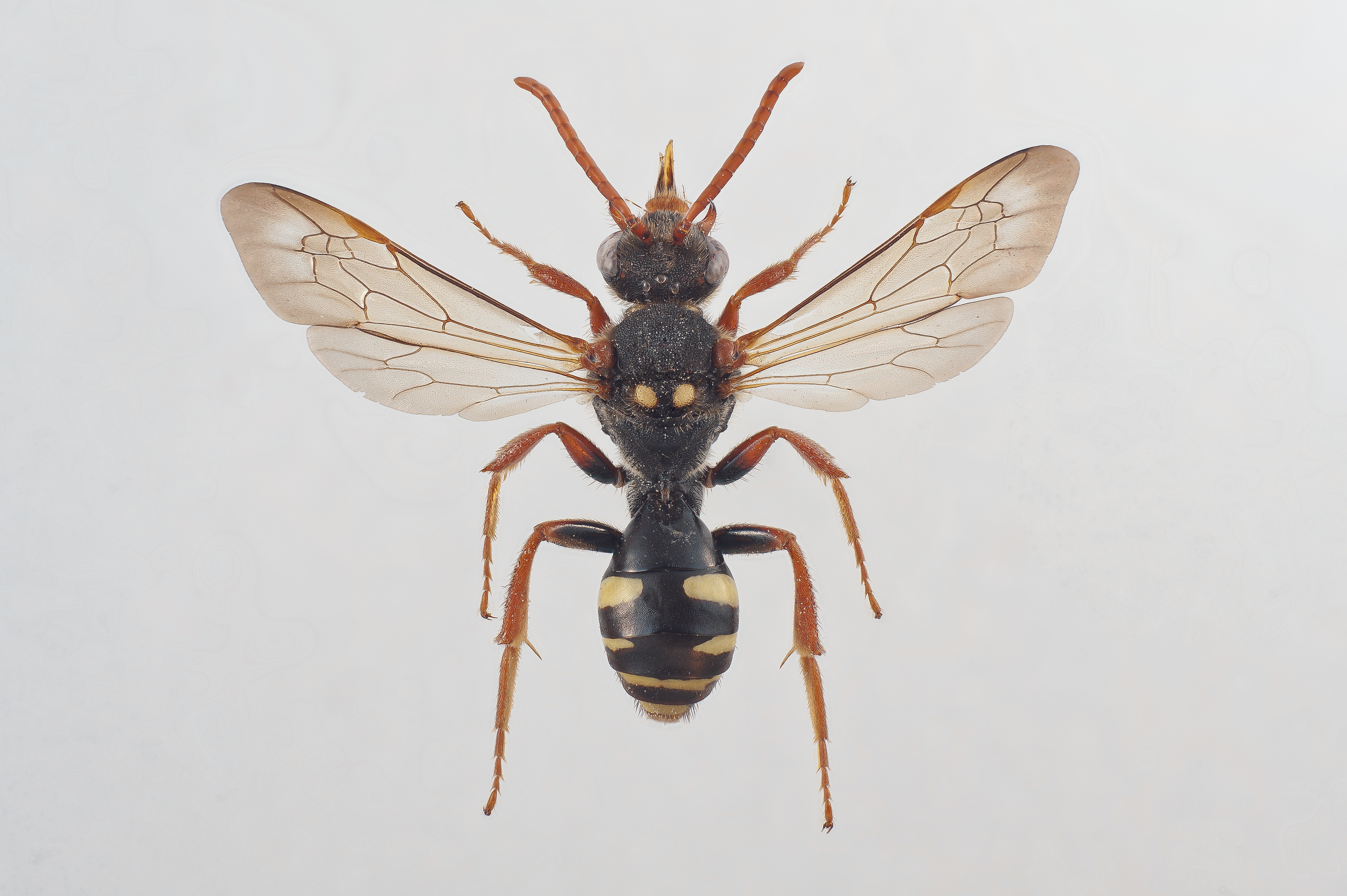

Scientific classification
- Kingdom: Animalia
- Phylum: Arthropoda
- Clade: Pancrustacea
- Class: Insecta
- Order: Hymenoptera
- Family: Apidae
- Genus: Nomada
- Species: N. marshamella

Binomial name
- Nomada marshamella (Kirby, 1802)

Synonyms
- Apis marshamella Kirby, 1802

= Nomada marshamella =

Species of bee

Nomada marshamella, Marsham's nomad bee, is a species of Palearctic cuckoo bee which appears to be a wasp mimic and which is cleptoparasite on the mining bees of the genus Andrena, especially A. scotica and A. trimmerana.

== Description ==
Nomada marshamella is a large (10-13mm) black and yellow nomad bee with a rather wasp like shape. It has well separated yellow spots on the second tergite with no reddish fringes on the tergites which are seen in similar species. The sternites are mostly black and yellow in colour with little or no red, the tegulae are orange. Male N. marshamella are difficult to identify when compared to N. fulvicornis but the yellow markings on the eye and tergite 1 are less extensive, there is some brown on the tegulae and it has longer antennae. It has a black head which is marked with yellow in males, which are smaller than the females.

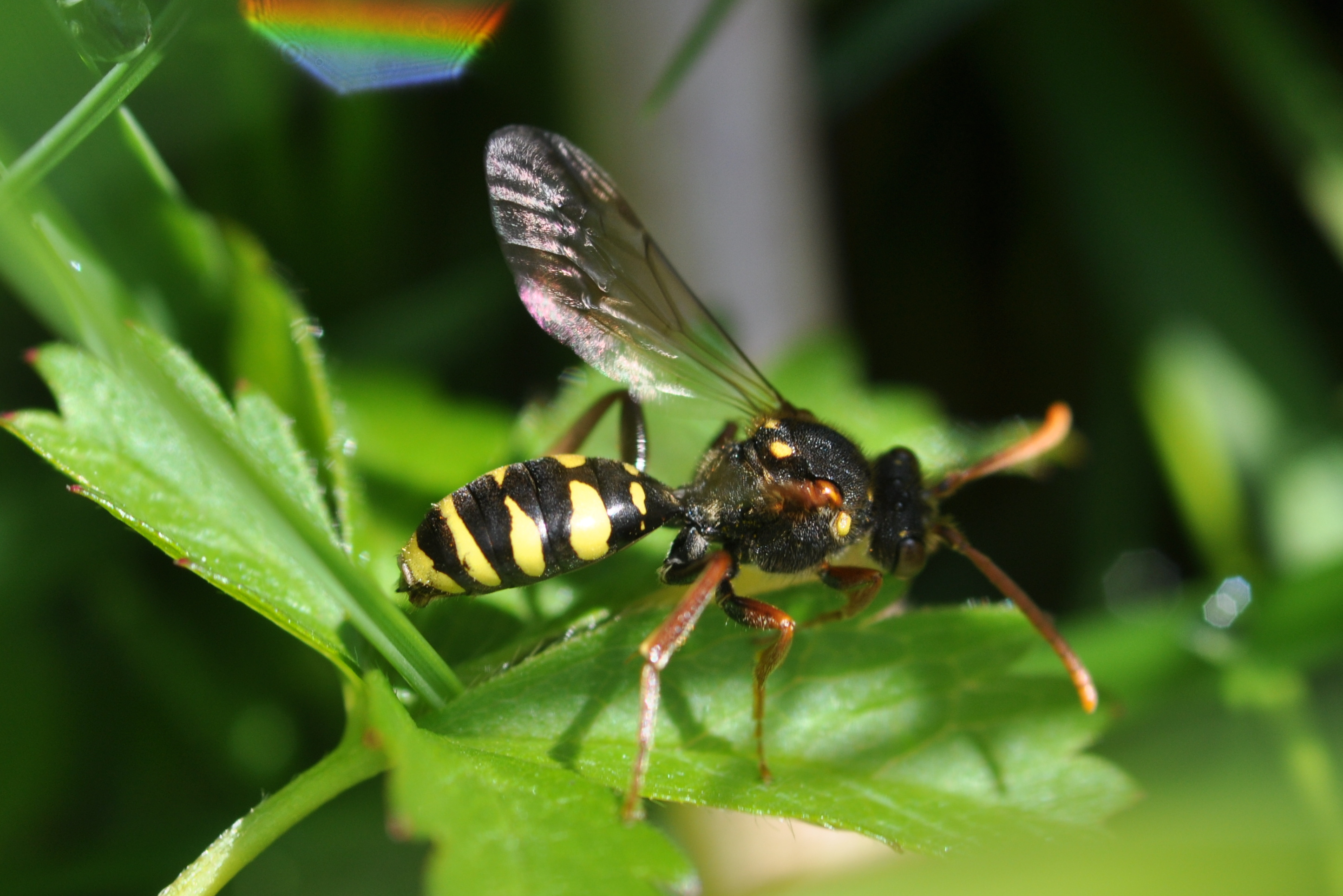
Nomada marshamella 2

== Distribution ==
Nomada marshamella is endemic to the western Palearctic ecozone from Britain and Ireland in the west east to Turkey, north to southern Finland and on the islands of Corsica and Malta.

== Habitat ==
Nomada marshamella is found in a wide variety of habitats, occurring both in coastal and inland areas, wherever its host mining bees can be found. Has been recorded with some regularity in suburban habitats such as gardens.

== Biology ==
Nomada marshamella is most frequently a univoltine species, but where the host used is the bivoltine Andrena trimmerana, then N. marshamella will also be bivoltine. The univoltine form is associated primarily with Andrena scotica, and sometimes A. nigroaenea, and it flies from early April to late June while the bivoltine form's normal host is A. trimmerana, and sometimes late nesting A. nigroaenae flying from late June into September. N. marshamella is known to cleptoparasitise the nests of A. scotica and they have been recovered from such nests. It is also thought that N.marshamella may parasitise Andrena ferox, A. stragulata, A. trimmerana, A. nigroaenea and A. haemorrhoa, in the Czech Republic A. rosae has also been recorded as a host of N. marshamella. A. trimmerana has only been recorded as a host of this species in England.

It is a highly polylectic species of bee in which the adults exploit a wide variety of flowers at different levels from ground to canopy for their nectar.

== Flight Period ==
Apparently both univoltine and bivoltine, depending on the host Andrena which is attacked. The univoltine form is apparently associated with A. carantonica and A. nigroaenea and flies in the spring and early summer from early April to late June. The host of the bivoltine form is not known for certain but it may attack both broods of A. trimmerana and late nesting A. carantonica and A. nigroaenea, both the latter species having a single, greatly extended flight period. This species flies from April to June and again from late June to the beginning of September. N. marshamella is certainly more numerous in the spring and early summer than later in the year.
