= Meloe carbonaceus =

Scientific classification
- Domain: Eukaryota
- Kingdom: Animalia
- Phylum: Arthropoda
- Class: Insecta
- Order: Coleoptera
- Suborder: Polyphaga
- Infraorder: Cucujiformia
- Family: Meloidae
- Genus: Meloe
- Species: M. carbonaceus

Binomial name
- Meloe carbonaceus LeConte, 1866

Species of beetle

Meloe carbonaceus is a species of blister beetles in the family Meloidae. It is found in North America.
