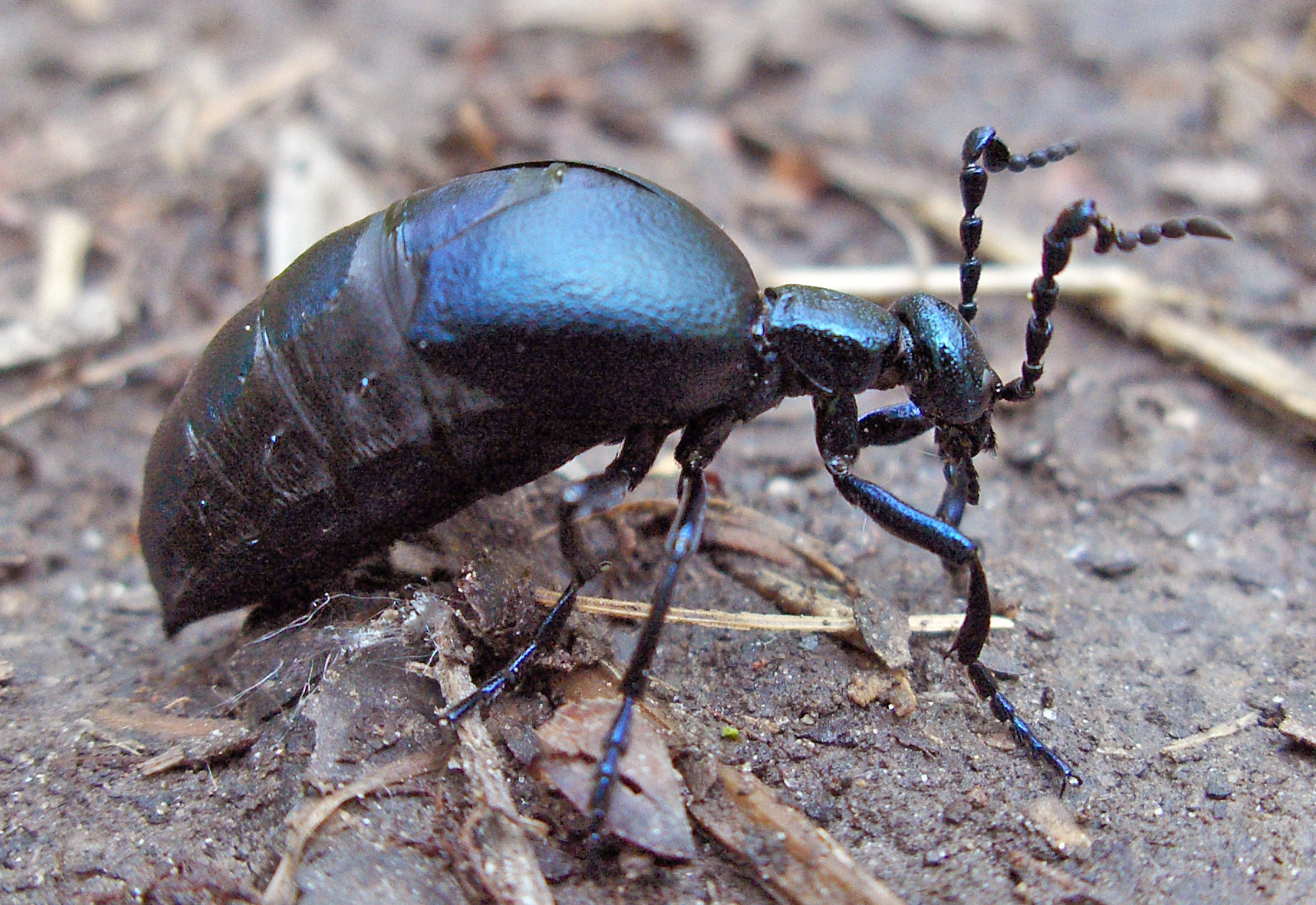
- Meloe violaceus

Scientific classification
- Kingdom: Animalia
- Phylum: Arthropoda
- Clade: Pancrustacea
- Class: Insecta
- Order: Coleoptera
- Suborder: Polyphaga
- Infraorder: Cucujiformia
- Family: Meloidae
- Subfamily: Meloinae
- Tribe: Meloini
- Genus: Meloe; Linnaeus, 1758

Species
- See text

Synonyms
- List: Afromeloe Schmidt, 1913; Alveomeloe Pripisnova, 1986; Anchomeloe Iablokoff-Khnzorian, 1983; Chiromeloë Reitter, 1911; Cnestocera Thomson, 1859; Cnetocera Reitter, 1911; Coeloemeloe; Coelomeloë Reitter, 1911; Desertimeloe Kaszab, 1964; Lampromeloe Reitter, 1911; Lasiomeloë Reitter, 1911; Listromeloë Reitter, 1911; Meioe Fuessly, 1775; Melittophagus Kirby & Spence, 1828; Meloedubius; Meloegonius Reitter, 1911; Meloenellus Reitter, 1911; Melve Fischer de Waldheim, 1803; Micromeloë Reitter, 1911; Proscarabaeus Schrank, 1781; Submeloegonius Pliginskii, 1935; Taphromeloe Reitter, 1911; Trapezimeloe Pliginskii, 1935; Treiodous Dugès, 1869; Treiodus; Triungulinus Dufour, 1828

= Meloe =

Genus of beetles

Meloe is a genus of blister beetles commonly referred to as oil beetles. The name derives from their defensive strategy: when threatened they release oily droplets of hemolymph from their joints (legs, neck, and antennae). This fluid is bright orange and contains cantharidin, a poisonous chemical compound. Wiping the chemical on skin can cause blistering and painful swelling of the skin. This defensive strategy is not exclusive to this genus; all meloids possess and exude cantharidin upon threat.

== Morphology ==
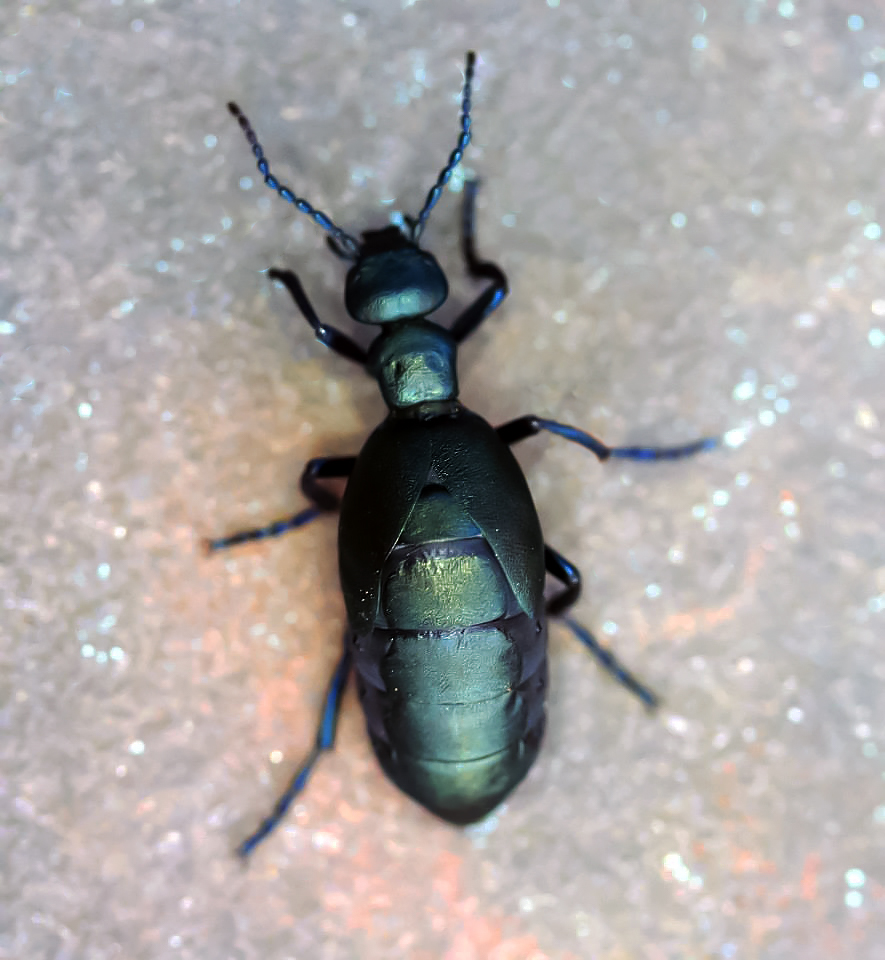
Oil beetle adult dorsal view

Members of this genus typically have shortened elytra and lack functional wings. They are often iridescent blue, green, or black with pits/punctures on the elytra and thorax, and a bloated abdomen. Some species of males have kinks in their antennae, which are shaped differently for different species.

== Biology ==
As with all other members of Meloidae, the larval cycle is hypermetamorphic; the larva goes through several body types, the first of which is typically a mobile triungulin that finds and attaches to a host in order to gain access to the host's offspring. They usually climb onto a flower head, and await a bee there. They will then attach themselves to the bee. If it is a male, they wait for mating with a female. They will switch to the female when this takes place. If the bee is a female, however, she will take them back to her nest unwittingly. Once in the nest, the larvae morphs into a grub-like "couch potato" and feeds upon all of the provisions and the larva. Next, they form a pupa and emerge in various seasons depending on the species. Each species of Meloe may attack only a single species or genus of bees. Some are generalists.

Though sometimes considered parasitoids, it appears that in general, the Meloe larva consumes the bee larva along with its provisions, and can often survive on the provisions alone; thus they do not truly qualify for this designation (see Parasitoid for definition).

Upon surfacing from their underground lives as larvae, the adults feed on plants in the families Ranunculaceae, Convolvulaceae, and Solanaceae.

Mating begins when a male mounts a female and releases chemical components through the kinks on the antennae, massaging her antennae and pulling them back. This serves to calm the female. Mating then occurs, with the male transferring his cantharidin to the female during this period and she coats her eggs with it.

== Species ==
The following species are recognised in the genus Meloe:

- Meloe aegyptius Brandt & Erichson, 1832
- Meloe aeneus Tauscher, 1812
- Meloe afer Bland, 1864
- Meloe affinis Lucas, 1849
- Meloe ajax Pinto, 1998
- Meloe aleuticus (Borchmann, 1942)
- Meloe algiricus Linnæus, 1758
- Meloe americanus Leach, 1815
- Meloe angusticollis Say, 1824 – short-winged blister beetle
- Meloe apenninicus Bologna, 1988
- Meloe auriculatus
- Meloe austrinus Wollaston, 1854
- Meloe autumnalis Olivier, 1792
- Meloe baamarani Ruiz & García-París, 2015
- Meloe balteata Pallas, 1782
- Meloe barbarus LeConte, 1861
- Meloe baudii Leoni, 1907
- Meloe bicolor Thunberg, 1791
- Meloe bitoricollis Pinto & Selander, 1970
- Meloe brevicollis Panzer, 1793 – short-necked oil beetle
- Meloe californicus Van Dyke, 1928
- Meloe campanicollis Pinto & Selander, 1970
- Meloe cantharoides Thunberg, 1791
- Meloe carbonaceus LeConte, 1866
- Meloe cavensis Petagna, 1819
- Meloe chiliensis Guérin, 1831
- Meloe chinensis Pan & Bologna, 2021
- Meloe cicatricosus Leach, 1815
- Meloe cinnabarina Scopoli, 1763
- Meloe coarctatus
- Meloe coecus Thunberg, 1791
- Meloe coelatus Reiche, 1857
- Meloe corvinus
- Meloe decemguttatus Thunberg, 1791
- Meloe decorus Brandt & Erichson, 1832
- Meloe dianella Pinto & Selander, 1970
- Meloe distincticornis Pan & Bologna, 2021
- Meloe dominicanus Poinar, 2009
- Meloe dugesi Champion, 1891
- Meloe erythrocnemus Pallas, 1782
- Meloe exiguus Pinto & Selander, 1970
- Meloe fenestrata Pallas, 1773
- Meloe fernandezi Pardo Alcaide, 1951
- Meloe flavicomus Wollaston, 1854
- Meloe formosensis Miwa, 1930
- Meloe foveolatus Guerin de Meneville, 1842
- Meloe franciscanus Van Dyke, 1928
- Meloe glazunovi Plignskij, 1910
- Meloe gomari
- Meloe gracilicornis Champion, 1891
- Meloe himalayensis Pan & Bologna, 2021
- Meloe hirsutus Thunberg, 1791
- Meloe hungarus Schrank, 1776
- Meloe ibericus
- Meloe impressus Kirby, 1837
- Meloe kashmirensis Pan & Bologna, 2021
- Meloe kaszabi Pan & Bologna, 2021
- Meloe laevis Leach, 1815 – oil beetle
- Meloe lateantennatus Pan & Bologna, 2021
- Meloe luctuosus Brandt & Erichson, 1832
- Meloe lunata Pallas, 1782
- Meloe mediterraneus Müller, 1925 - mediterranean oil beetle
- Meloe menoko
- Meloe nanus Lucas, 1849
- Meloe nebulosus Champion, 1891
- Meloe niger Kirby, 1837
- Meloe occultus Pinto & Selander, 1970
- Meloe ocellata Pallas, 1773
- Meloe oculatus Thunberg, 1791
- Meloe olivieri Chevrolat, 1833
- Meloe orientalis Pan & Bologna, 2021
- Meloe pantherinus Sánchez-Vialas, López-Estrada, Ruiz & García-París, 2024
- Meloe paropacus Dillon, 1952
- Meloe podalirii Heer, 1847
- Meloe poggii Pan & Bologna, 2021
- Meloe proscarabaeus Linnaeus, 1758 - black oil beetle
- Meloe quadricollis Van Dyke, 1928
- Meloe reitteri Escherich, 1889
- Meloe rufiventris Germar, 1832
- Meloe rugosus Marsham, 1802 - rugged oil beetle
- Meloe sarmaticus Shapovalov, 2012
- Meloe semenowi Jakovlev, 1897,2017
- Meloe shapovalovi Pan & Bologna, 2021
- Meloe sibirica Pallas, 1773
- Meloe spec Linnæus, 1758
- Meloe strigulosus Mannerheim, 1852
- Meloe trifascis Pallas, 1773
- Meloe tripunctatus Thunberg, 1791
- Meloe tropicus Motschulsky, 1856
- Meloe tuccia Rossi, [1790]
- Meloe uralensis Pallas, 1777
- Meloe ursus Thunberg, 1791
- Meloe vandykei Pinto & Selander, 1970
- Meloe variegatus Donovan, 1793
- Meloe violaceus Marsham, 1802 - violet oil beetle
- Meloe xuhaoi Pan & Bologna, 2021
- Meloë fasciatus Houttuyn
- Meloë flammeus Houttuyn
