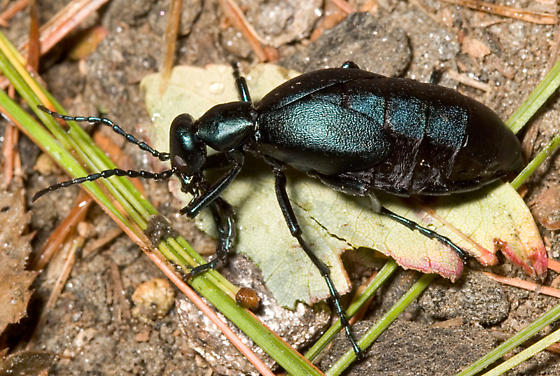

Scientific classification
- Kingdom: Animalia
- Phylum: Arthropoda
- Clade: Pancrustacea
- Class: Insecta
- Order: Coleoptera
- Suborder: Polyphaga
- Infraorder: Cucujiformia
- Family: Meloidae
- Genus: Meloe
- Species: M. impressus

Binomial name
- Meloe impressus Kirby, 1837

= Impressive meloine beetle =

Species of beetle

The impressive meloine beetle (Meloe impressus) is a species of blister beetle in the family Meloidae. It is found in North America.
