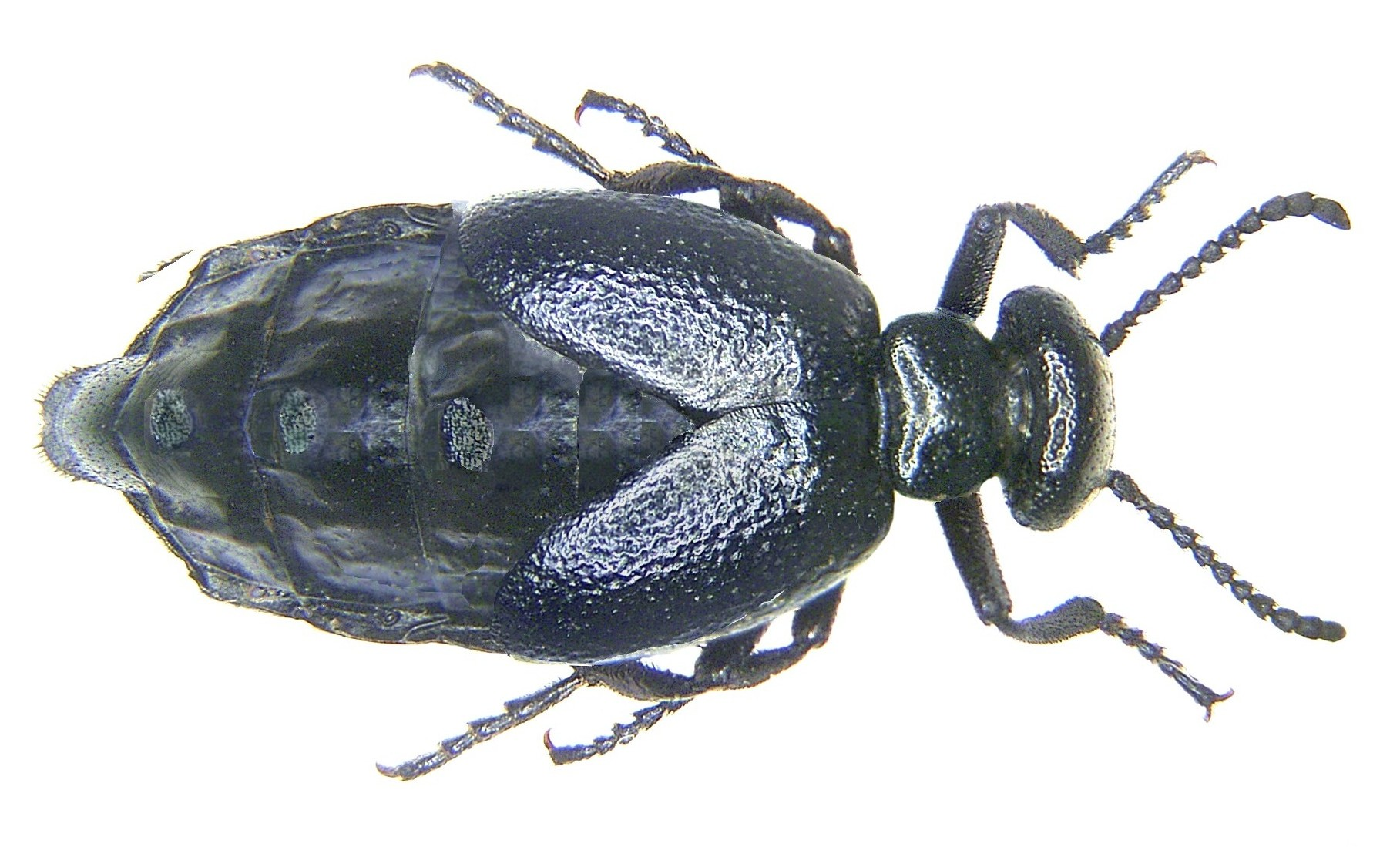

Scientific classification
- Kingdom: Animalia
- Phylum: Arthropoda
- Clade: Pancrustacea
- Class: Insecta
- Order: Coleoptera
- Suborder: Polyphaga
- Infraorder: Cucujiformia
- Family: Meloidae
- Genus: Meloe
- Species: M. brevicollis

Binomial name
- Meloe brevicollis Panzer, 1793

= Meloe brevicollis =

Species of beetle

Meloe brevicollis is a European oil beetle. It is also known as the short-necked oil beetle.

It had been thought that the beetle had been extinct in the UK since the 1940s, due to intensive farming. However, in 2007 a small population was discovered in south Devon.

In 2010, 40 beetles were found on four sites on the Hebridean island of Coll. The beetle is flightless and has parasitic young that depend on solitary nesting bees for survival, raising the question of how it arrived on the island. Jeanne Robinson, the curator of entomology at Glasgow Museums said: "They are very vulnerable to disturbance and what the Devon and Coll sites have in common is that they have been relatively undisturbed for a long time.... We are hoping there is the potential to do some genetic analysis to see where the population came from." There are records of the beetle being found in Ireland and it is possible the colony had been dispersed from there.

In 2014 staff from RSPB Scotland and Buglife traveled to Coll to carry out an extensive survey for the beetle. Incredibly they found over 150 beetles and 2 previously unknown sites for the species making Coll the most important site for the beetle in the UK.

The species was rediscovered in Pembrokeshire, in Wales in 2020, having remained unrecorded there since 1944.
