= Meloe strigulosus =

Scientific classification
- Domain: Eukaryota
- Kingdom: Animalia
- Phylum: Arthropoda
- Class: Insecta
- Order: Coleoptera
- Suborder: Polyphaga
- Infraorder: Cucujiformia
- Family: Meloidae
- Genus: Meloe
- Species: M. strigulosus

Binomial name
- Meloe strigulosus Mannerheim, 1852

Species of beetle

Meloe strigulosus is a species of blister beetle in the family Meloidae. It is found in Central America and North America.
