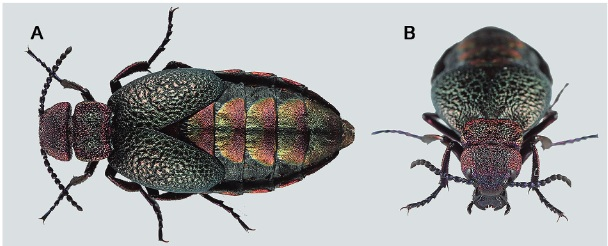

Scientific classification
- Kingdom: Animalia
- Phylum: Arthropoda
- Class: Insecta
- Order: Coleoptera
- Suborder: Polyphaga
- Infraorder: Cucujiformia
- Family: Meloidae
- Genus: Meloe
- Species: M. pantherinus

Binomial name
- Meloe pantherinus (Sánchez-Vialas, López-Estrada, Ruiz & García-París, 2024)

Synonyms
- Lampromeloe pantherinus Sánchez-Vialas, López-Estrada, Ruiz & García-París, 2024

= Meloe pantherinus =

Species of beetle

Meloe pantherinus is a species of beetle of the family Meloidae. This species is found in the Atlas Mountains and adjacent areas in northwestern Africa.

Adults reach a length of about 13.2–18 mm. The head and pronotum are dark-purple, with a greenish central area. The elytra are darker, with very dark purple, almost blackish areolas and very dark greenish hues between areolas. The appendages are dark purple and the abdomen is dorsally black, with each of sclerotized tergal areas (both on dorsal and ventral surfaces) two-coloured, greenish anteriorly and purple posteriorly.

== Etymology ==
The species name pantherinus (meaning panther-like) refers to the areolar pattern of the elytra, somewhat reminiscent of the fur pattern of a leopard.
