= Meloe franciscanus =

Scientific classification
- Domain: Eukaryota
- Kingdom: Animalia
- Phylum: Arthropoda
- Class: Insecta
- Order: Coleoptera
- Suborder: Polyphaga
- Infraorder: Cucujiformia
- Family: Meloidae
- Genus: Meloe
- Species: M. franciscanus

Binomial name
- Meloe franciscanus Van Dyke, 1928

Species of beetle

Meloe franciscanus is a species of blister beetle in the family Meloidae. It is found in the deserts of the southwestern United States. The larvae are parasites of bee larvae, eating them and consuming their provisions.

== Distribution and habitat ==
Meloe franciscanus is endemic to the southwestern United States where it is found among dunes in deserts. This habitat is variable and includes patches of vegetation surrounded by barren areas of sand. One of the plants here is Astragalus lentiginosus which provides food for the adult beetles, which are flightless, and nectar for their host bees. The eggs of the beetle are typically laid at the base of the plants in these "islands" of vegetation.

== Ecology ==
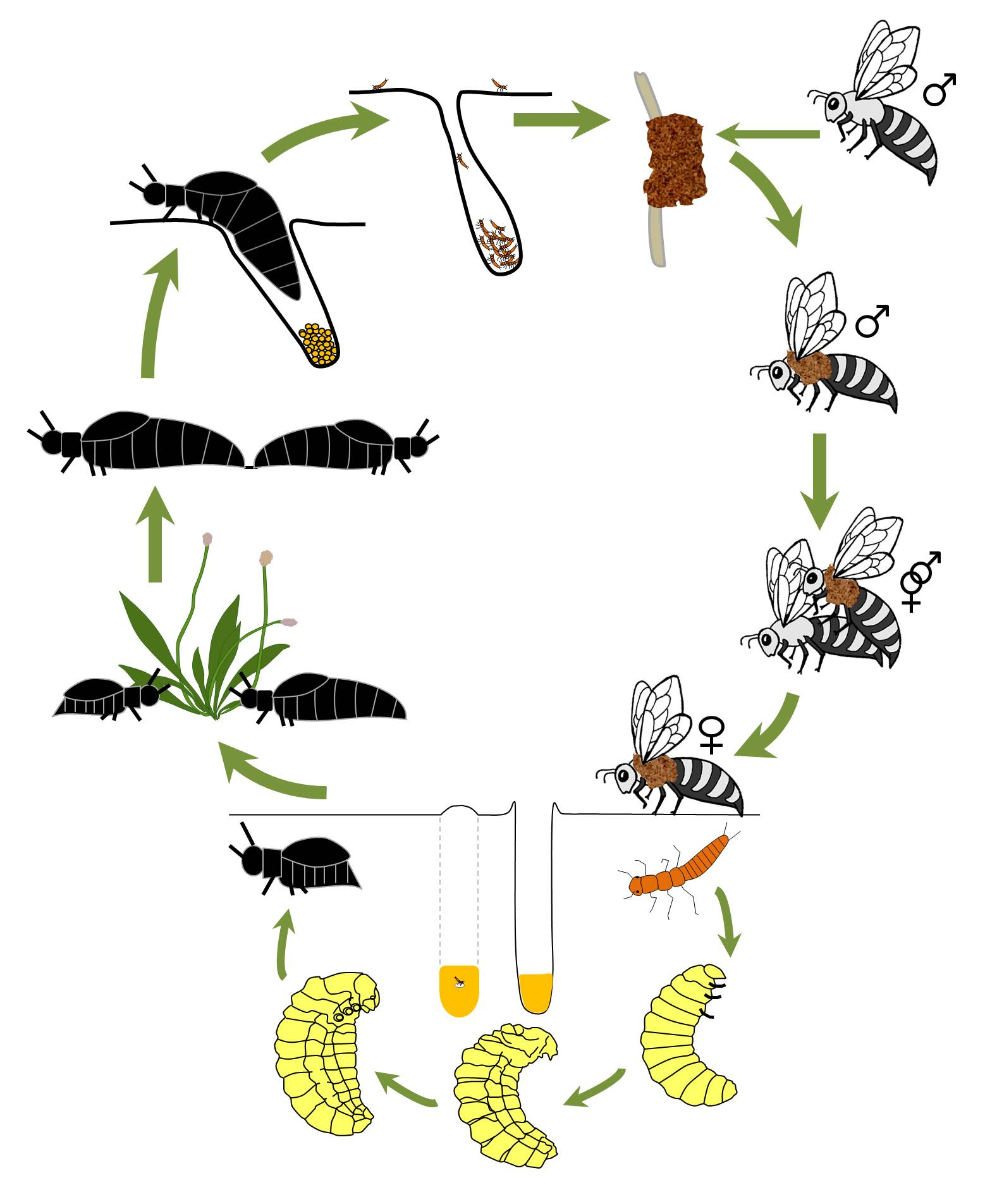
Life cycle of M. franciscanus

The larvae of this beetle successfully make use of sexual deception by mimicking the mating signals of another insect species. Adult female beetles lay eggs in a compact mass underground, with the egg aggregations on average containing 761 eggs. The beetle larvae emerge from the ground in a group, ascend vegetation one after the other and form themselves into a compact ball in an elevated location. They then release a volatile substance similar to the pheromones emitted by a female bee, which attracts a male digger bee. This bee mistakes the ball of larvae for a female digger bee, and attempts to mate with it. The beetle larvae cling to the bee, transferring to a female bee when the male finds and mates with one. The larvae then get carried to the female digger bee's nest where they detach from the bee and make themselves at home, feeding on the pollen and nectar, placed there by the female bee for her own offspring, and consuming her eggs and young.

The digger bee species parasitized in this way in Oregon and the Mojave Desert have been identified as Habropoda pallida and Habropoda miserabilis. Researchers have found that the triungulins (newly hatched blister beetle larvae) climb to different heights in the vegetation before aggregation depending on the habits of the bees in that locality, and the height above the ground at which the males search for mates.
