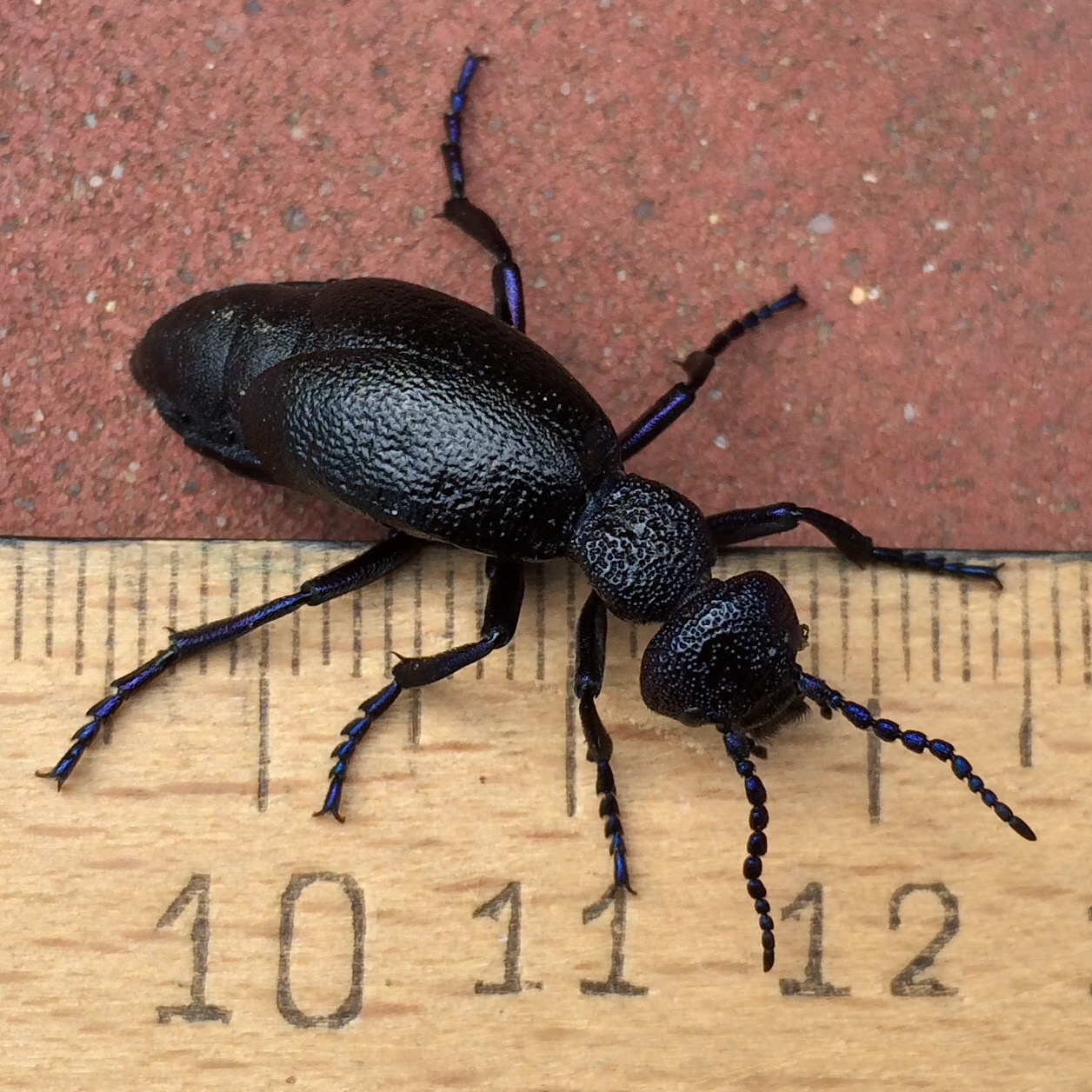

Scientific classification
- Kingdom: Animalia
- Phylum: Arthropoda
- Clade: Pancrustacea
- Class: Insecta
- Order: Coleoptera
- Suborder: Polyphaga
- Infraorder: Cucujiformia
- Family: Meloidae
- Genus: Meloe
- Species: M. proscarabaeus

Binomial name
- Meloe proscarabaeus Linnaeus, 1758

= Meloe proscarabaeus =

Species of beetle

Meloe proscarabaeus is a European oil beetle. It lives in meadows, field margins and other warm sites in all but the far north of the continent. It lacks hind wings and the elytra are correspondingly reduced in size.

== Life cycle ==
Eggs are laid in the soil by females. When the larvae hatch, they climb into a flower, and await visiting solitary bees. With their well-developed claws, the larvae attach themselves to the bee and return with it to its nest. Here, they feed on the bee's eggs and the pollen and nectar it had collected. The larva pupates in the bee's nest, and leaves the nest to seek a mate directly afterwards. The beetle and its life cycle are described in detail by Gerald Durrell in his autobiographical book My Family and Other Animals.

The larvae can also bypass the need for a flower by producing a flowery scent, which attracts bees, even when outside a flower.

== Sources ==
- Michael Chinery (1993). Collins Field Guide: Insects of Britain and Northern Europe. 3rd edition. HarperCollins, London. pp. 320 pp. + 60 colour plates. ISBN 0-00-219918-1.
- Wilfried Stichmann (1999). Der große Kosmos Naturführer. Tiere und Pflanzen. Franckh-Kosmos, Stuttgart. p. 896 pp.
- Gerald Durrell (1956). My Family and Other Animals. House of Stratus. ISBN 0755111974.
- https://www.science.org/content/article/bee-hunting-beetles-are-first-animals-known-fake-smell-flowers

== Gallery ==
Female European oil beetles (Meloe proscarabaeus) feeding and traveling in Kněžičky national nature reserve, Czech Republic

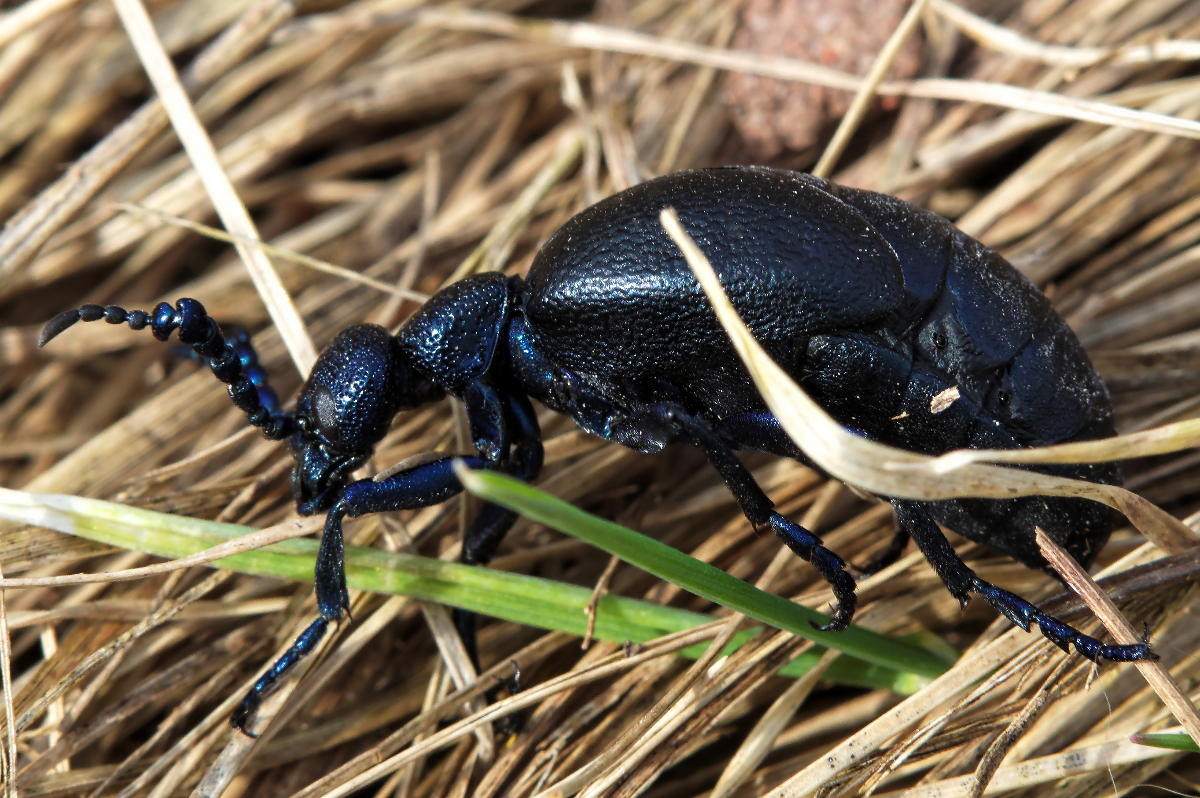
Meloe Proscarabaeus (male)

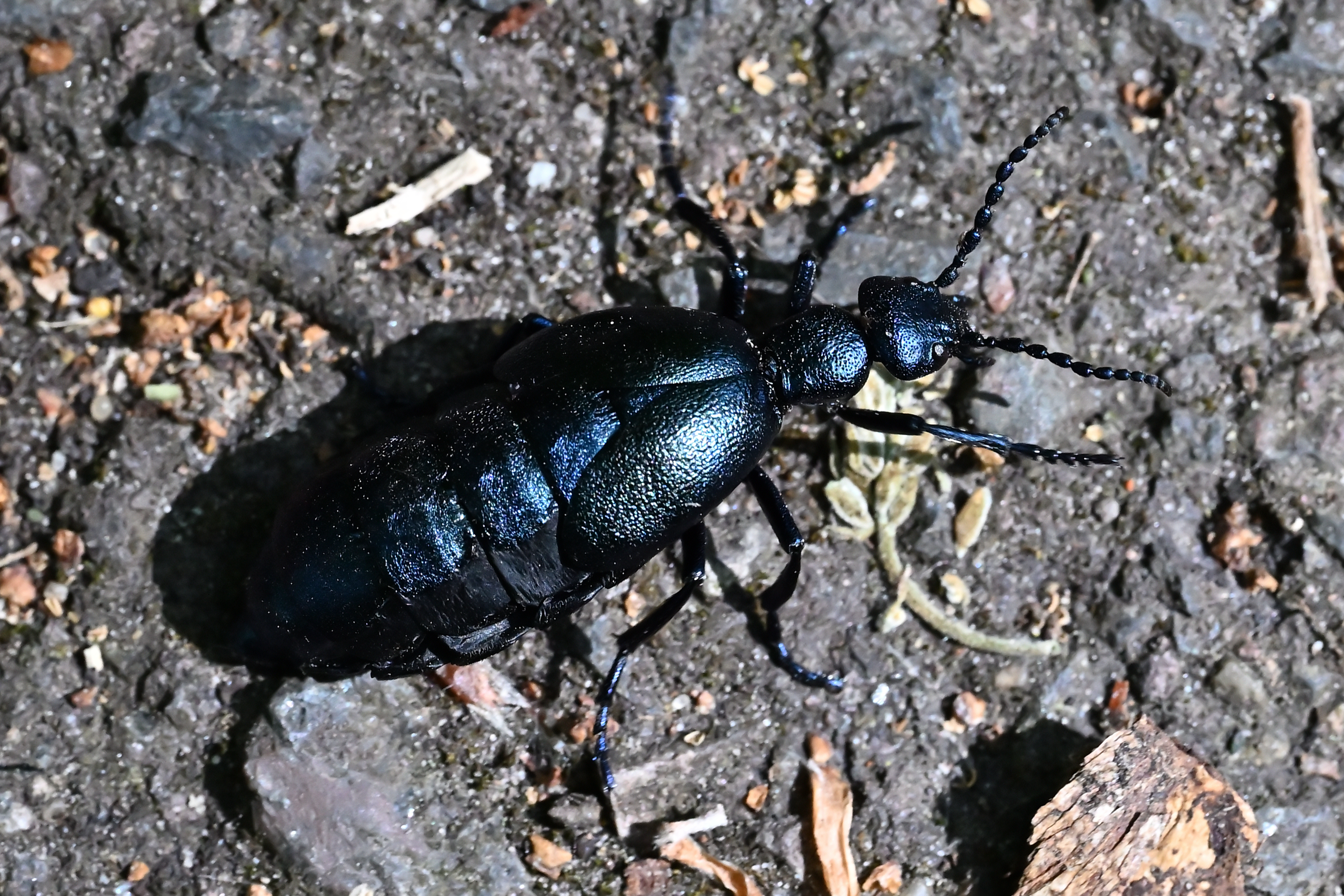
Meloe Proscarabaeus (female)
