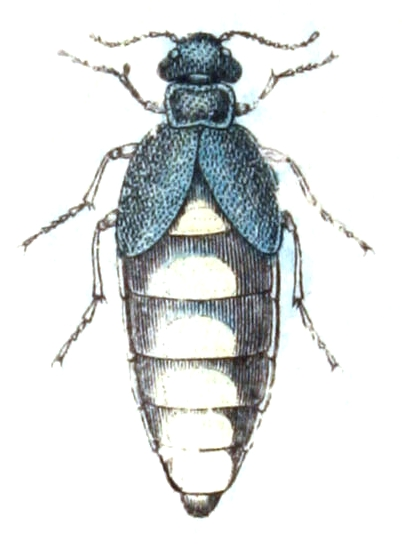

Scientific classification
- Kingdom: Animalia
- Phylum: Arthropoda
- Clade: Pancrustacea
- Class: Insecta
- Order: Coleoptera
- Suborder: Polyphaga
- Infraorder: Cucujiformia
- Family: Meloidae
- Genus: Meloe
- Species: M. variegatus

Binomial name
- Meloe variegatus Donovan, 1793

Synonyms
- Lampromeloe variegatus; Meloe scabrosus Marsham, 1802; Meloe scabrosa Laporte, 1840; Meloe variegatus var. cupreus Baudi, 1878; Meloe variegatus var. areolatus Reitter, 1895

= Meloe variegatus =

Species of beetle

Meloe variegatus is a European oil beetle. It is commonly known as the variegated oil beetle. Adult beetles feed on leaves and can be pests of crops, while the larvae are parasitic on solitary bees.

== Description ==
It is flightless, with short elytra overlapping at the front. Its exposed abdominal segments are brightly coloured on the upper side. Like all member of the genus Meloe, it releases a smelly, oily fluid when alarmed.

== Habitat ==
It is active between April and July in grassy places, chewing the leaves of various plants. They are considered pests of sugar beet, cabbage, and winter rye.

== Life cycle ==
The larvae primarily parasitise the nests of solitary bees, although they have been recorded in a colony of social bees in Poland.

After fertilized eggs have been laid, the first instar larvae hatch after 24 hours. The larvae climb to the top of a nearby blade of grass or a flower and remain immobile until they are able to attach to a passing bee with their mouthparts. The larvae puncture the bee's intersegmental membrances to feed on the haemolymph. Up to 15 larvae have been observed on one individual bee. Later stages of larvae growth of M. variegatus are not parasitic – they feed on the food stores gathered by the bees. The larvae pupate in the nest of solitary bees, but are rarely able to do so in larger colonies as they are removed by the worker bees.

== Distribution ==
M. variegatus is classified as 'regionally extinct' in the United Kingdom. It can still be found in central Europe and the Iberian peninsula.

== Use in traditional medicine ==
In the early 19th century, this species was used in Germany as a fanciful cure for rabies (referred to as "hydrophobia" by William Elford Leach). The beetles were also hung up by the neck until dry, so that the oily secretion they gave off could be collected and administered. It was also considered to be a diuretic.

== Subspecies ==
- Meloe variegatus variegatus
- Meloe variegatus mandzhuricus Pliginskij, 1930
