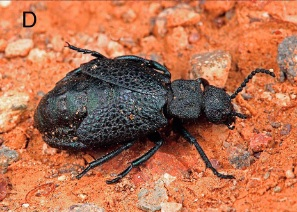

Scientific classification
- Kingdom: Animalia
- Phylum: Arthropoda
- Class: Insecta
- Order: Coleoptera
- Suborder: Polyphaga
- Infraorder: Cucujiformia
- Family: Meloidae
- Genus: Meloe
- Species: M. cavensis

Binomial name
- Meloe cavensis Petagna, 1819

Synonyms
- Lampromeloe cavensis; Meloe purpurascens Germar, 1836; Meloe sardous Gené, 1836; Meloe aenea Laporte, 1840; Meloe latreillei Reiche in Marseul, 1867; Meloe specularis Gredler, 1877; Meloe stellata Pliginskij, 1923

= Meloe cavensis =

Species of beetle

Meloe cavensis is a species of beetle of the family Meloidae. This species is found in the western Palaearctic region.
