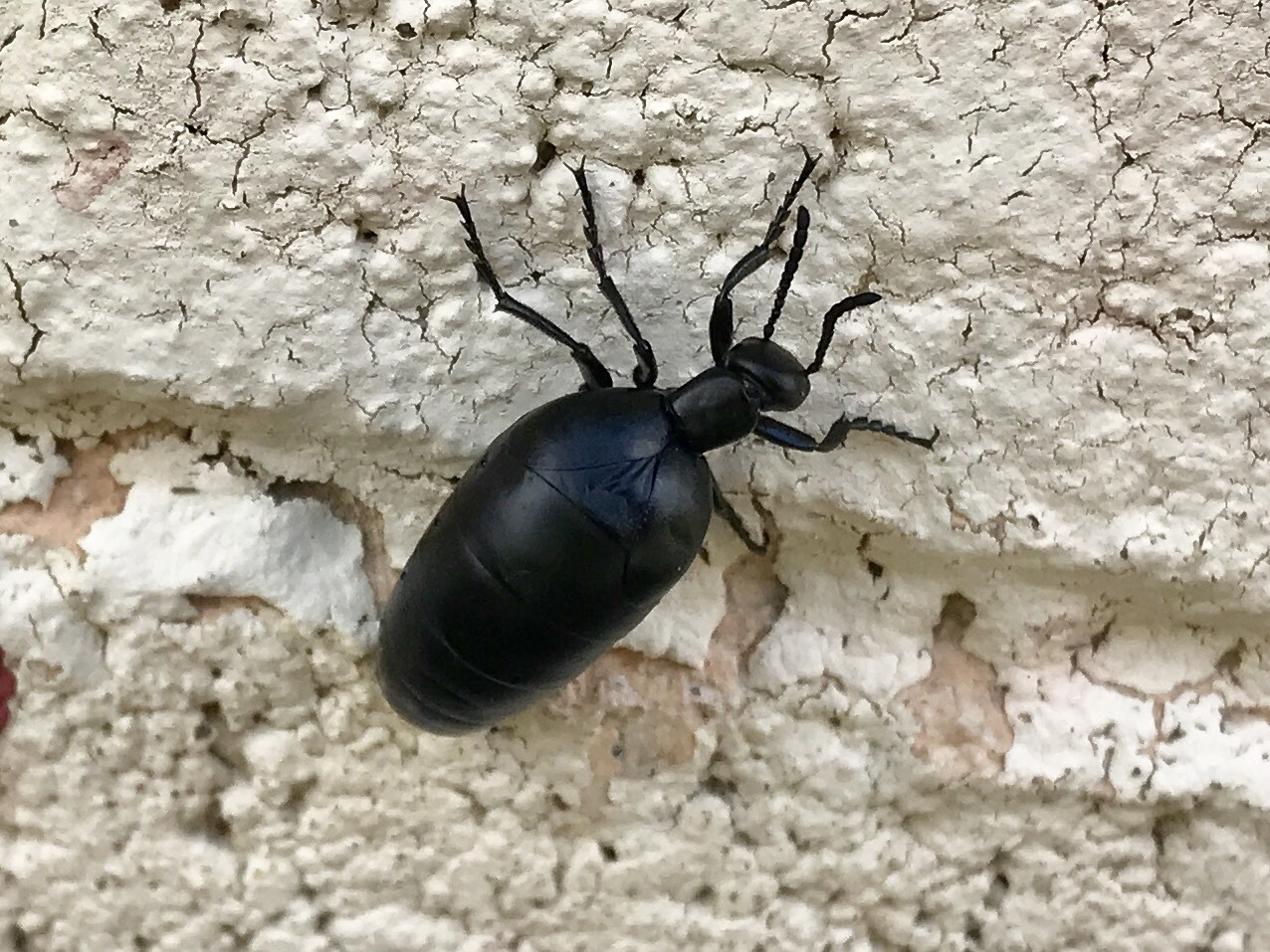

Scientific classification
- Domain: Eukaryota
- Kingdom: Animalia
- Phylum: Arthropoda
- Class: Insecta
- Order: Coleoptera
- Suborder: Polyphaga
- Infraorder: Cucujiformia
- Family: Meloidae
- Genus: Meloe
- Species: M. laevis

Binomial name
- Meloe laevis Leach, 1815

= Meloe laevis =

Species of beetle

Meloe laevis, the oil beetle, is a species of blister beetle in the family Meloidae. It is found in the Caribbean, Central America, and North America.

== Life cycle ==
Eggs normally hatch during the summer. What the larvae do upon hatching, as with all other Meloe species, is remarkable, in that they are hypermetamorphic. Tiny, freshly hatched larvae, bear the special name of "triungulin," or the more general term planidium. The triungulin emerges from the ground, climbs onto a flower, and waits for a bee. When a bee arrives the triungulin climbs aboard. If the bee is a male, the larva accompanies his bee until it mates, when the triungulin transfers onto the female. If the triungulin's transport bee was a female in the first place, however, unwittingly the female bee carries the larva to her underground nest. In the nest, the triungulin morphs into a grub-like "couch potato" and feeds on the bee's developing larvae as well as the food provided to the bee larvae. Eventually the developing larva metamorphoses into a pupa, which later metamorphoses into an adult. Each Meloe species may attack only a single bee species or genus, or various species.

== Courtship & nesting ==
Courtship of Meloe leaevis is relatively simple: The male strokes and palpates the female's body with his antennae until she's ready. After mating, the female usually excavates a cavity in the soil, where she deposits her eggs. Then she scrapes loose soil left from the digging process back into the hole, tamping it down as she backs from the hole. Females may lay eggs several times in their lives.

== Interactions with humans ==
As is typical among Meloe species, when Meloe leaevis adults are disturbed, they may remain upright, or fall onto one side. In either case the legs are drawn up toward the body and the beetle stops moving except for occasional flicking of the leg tips, or tarsi. Usually a dark orange liquid exudes from certain leg joints and sometimes handled adults may regurgitate.

Meloe leaevis has been documented feeding on potatoes and alfalfa.

In the Mexican state of Chiapas, the consumption of adult Meloe laevis has been documented.
