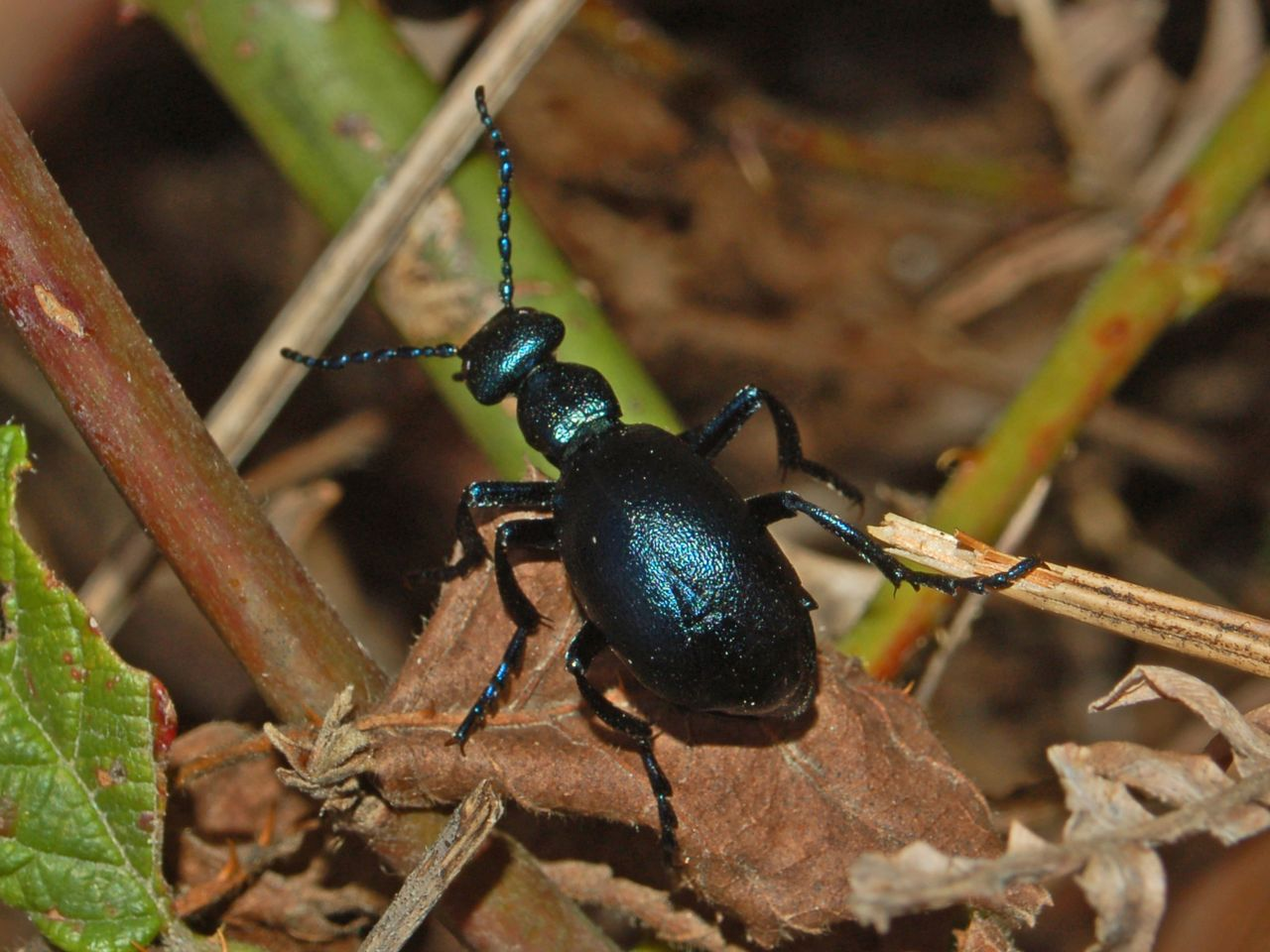

Scientific classification
- Kingdom: Animalia
- Phylum: Arthropoda
- Clade: Pancrustacea
- Class: Insecta
- Order: Coleoptera
- Suborder: Polyphaga
- Infraorder: Cucujiformia
- Family: Meloidae
- Genus: Meloe
- Species: M. violaceus

Binomial name
- Meloe violaceus Marsham, 1802

Synonyms
- Meloe aprilina Meyer, 1793; Meloe prolifericornis Motschulsky, 1873; Meloe rufipes Bremi-Wolf, 1855; Meloe similis Marsham, 1802; Meloe strigosus Motschulsky, 1873; Pediculus melittae Kirby, 1802; Proscarabaeus violaceus (Marsham) Stephens, 1829; Meloe proscarabaeus (Linnaeus) Sulzer, 1761

= Meloe violaceus =

Species of beetle

Meloe violaceus, the violet oil beetle, is a species of oil beetle belonging to the family Meloidae subfamily Meloinae.

This beetle is present in most of Europe, in the eastern Palearctic realm, in the Near East, and in North Africa.

This species is characterised by hypermetamorphosis, a kind of complete insect metamorphosis in which, in addition to the normal stages of larva, nymph and imago, they have several others, with great differences in appearance and way of life.

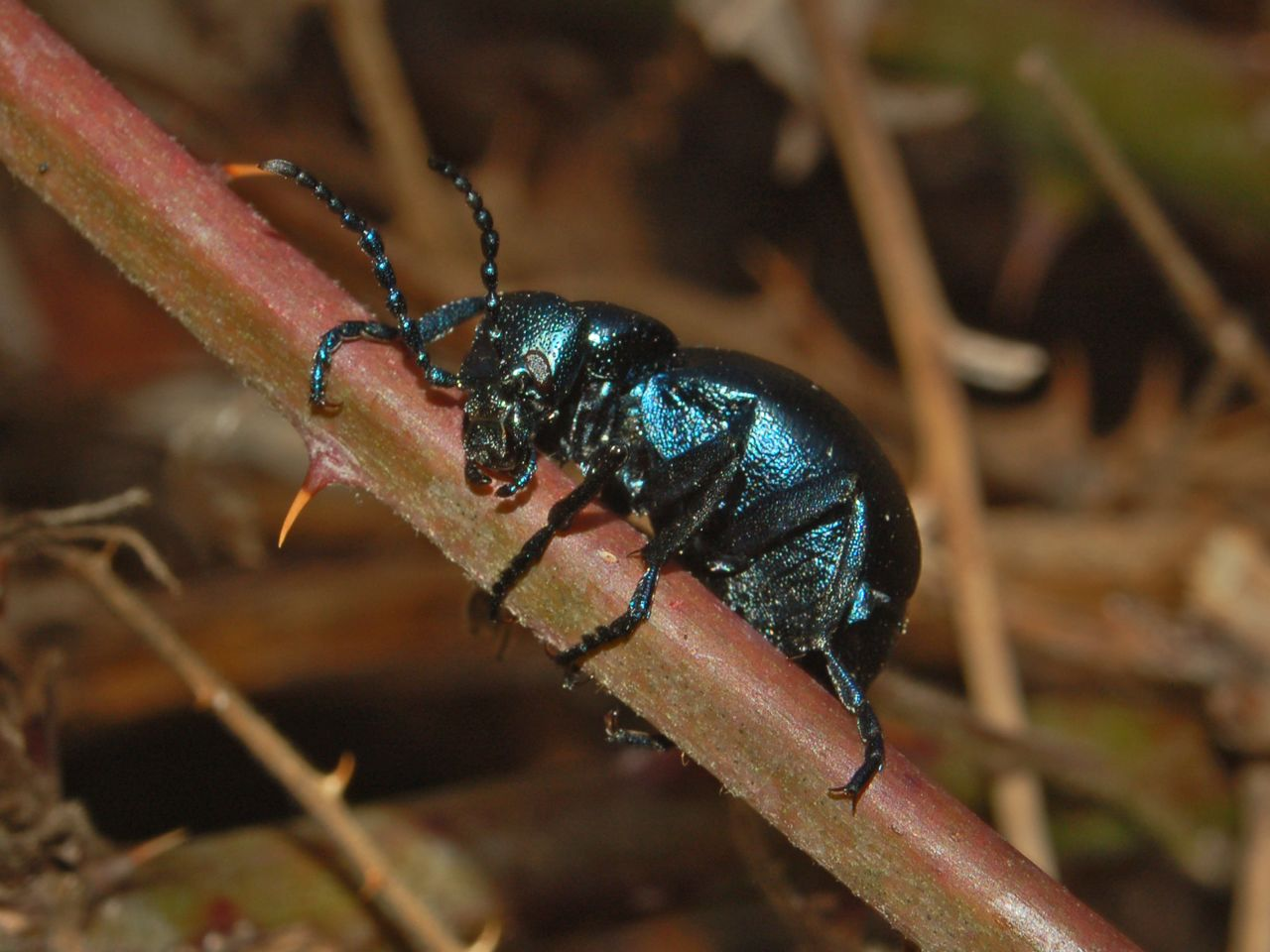
Meloe violaceus – Lateral view

The body of Meloe violaceus is 10–30 millimetres (0.4–1.2 in) long, females are somewhat larger than the males. These beetle are black-blue or violet-blue, head and pronotum are very finely dotted and the elytra are quite shorter than the abdomen, as in other Meloinae species.

The adults live on a sunny, dry area with flowering plants, feeding on pollen.

In May–June the female digs into the soil 20–30 millimetres (0.8–1.2 in) deep cylindrical holes, where they lay a very large quantity of eggs (about 2,000–10,000).

After about a month larvae emerge from eggs and climb up on grass or on flowers, waiting to cling to the thorax of approaching potential host insects seeking pollen or nectar.

The larvae have an exclusively parasitic life, primarily in the nests of solitary bees, or sometimes of locusts. If the larvae have inadvertently selected a honey bee, they die in the hive and may cause serious damage.

When the host female bee lays eggs in its cells, the first-stage larva of the violet oil beetle eats the eggs of the bee, increases in volume and becomes the second-stage larva, which continues its development eating honey and pollen. The larva, after other two stages, forms the nymph and finally the imago.
