= Meloe occultus =

Scientific classification
- Domain: Eukaryota
- Kingdom: Animalia
- Phylum: Arthropoda
- Class: Insecta
- Order: Coleoptera
- Suborder: Polyphaga
- Infraorder: Cucujiformia
- Family: Meloidae
- Genus: Meloe
- Species: M. occultus

Binomial name
- Meloe occultus Pinto & Selander, 1970

Species of beetle

Meloe occultus is a species of blister beetle in the family Meloidae. It is found in North America.
