= Jean Antoine Dours =

French entomologist

Jean Antoine Dours (22 March 1824 in Bagnères de Bigorre – 29 July 1874 in Amiens) was a French entomologist specialising in Hymenoptera.

== Works ==
- Essai de topograhie médicale sur Daya, province d'Oran (Dissertation)
- Catalogue raisonné des hyménoptères du département de la Somme., Amiens: Mellifères 1861
- Monographie iconographique du genre Anthophora Latreille, Mémoires de la Societé Linnéene de Nord de la France, 2, Amiens 1869
- Hyménoptères nouveaux du bassin méditerranéen. Revue et Magasin de Zoologie (2)23, p. 293 -. 312, 349 - 359, 396 - 399, 418 - 434 (1872)
- Catalogue synonymique des Hyménoptères de France. Mémoires de la Societé Linnéene de Nord de la France (Amiens), 3, 1–230.(1873) See https://archive.org/details/ants_14701 for pages on ants

== Collection ==
Excepting the material he acquired from Joseph-Étienne Giraud which was returned to that entomologist, Dours collection was burned in a fire in the U.S.A.
