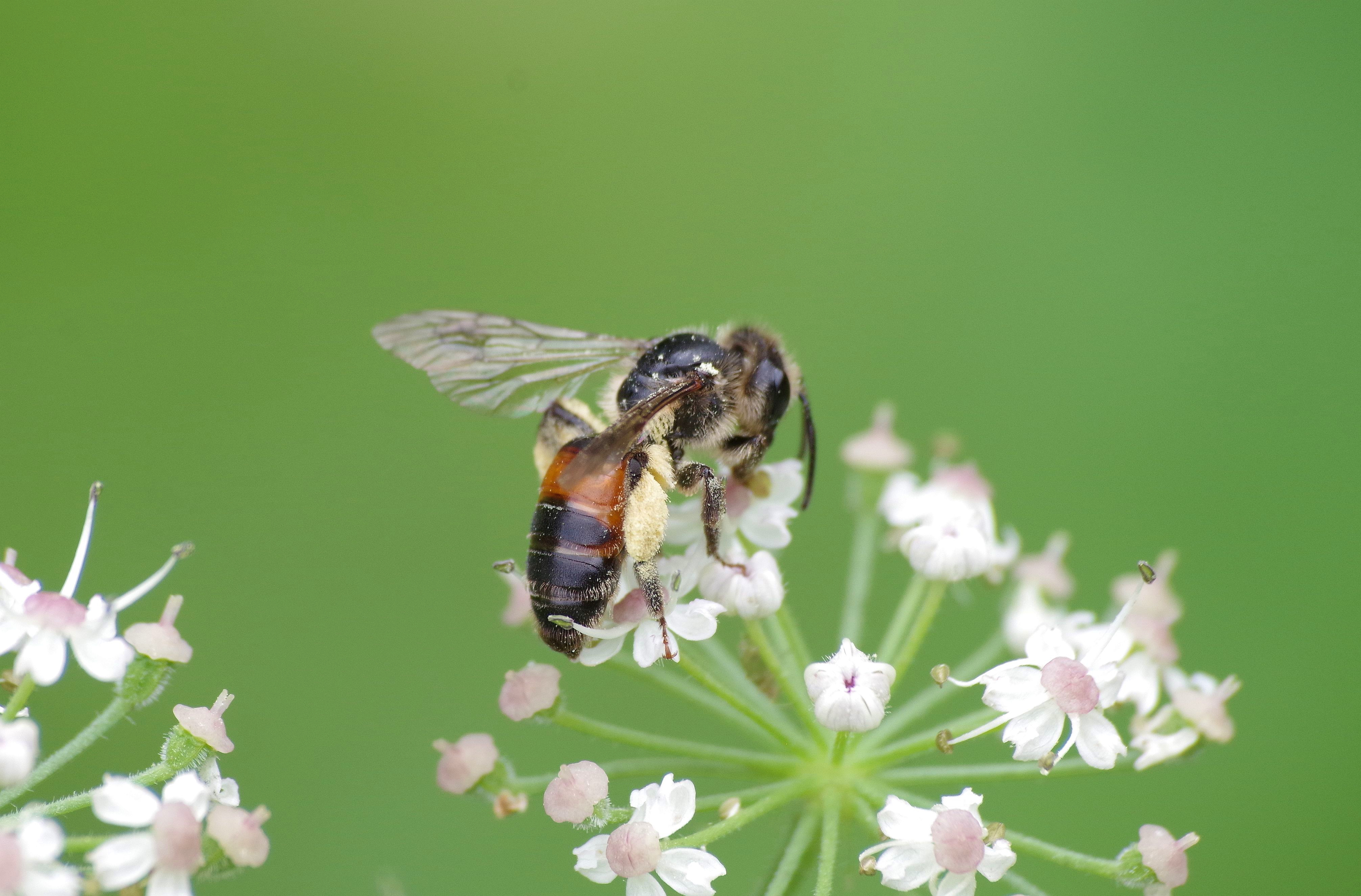

Scientific classification
- Domain: Eukaryota
- Kingdom: Animalia
- Phylum: Arthropoda
- Class: Insecta
- Order: Hymenoptera
- Family: Andrenidae
- Genus: Andrena
- Species: A. rosae

Binomial name
- Andrena rosae Panzer, 1801

= Andrena rosae =

Species of bee

Andrena rosae is a Palearctic species of mining bee.
