= Theodosio De Stefani Perez =

Italian naturalist and entomologist

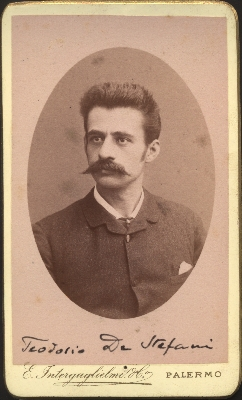
- Theodosio De Stefani Perez
- Born: 6 February 1853; Santa Ninfa, Trapani, Kingdom of the Two Sicilies
- Died: 25 February 1935 (aged 82); Giacalone, Palermo
- Scientific career
- Fields: naturalist, entomologist

Theodosio De Stefani Perez (1853 – 1935) was an Italian naturalist and entomologist who specialised in Hymenoptera and Diptera.

The Via Teodosio De Stefani Perez in Palermo honours him. His collection of Coleoptera is held by the Zoology Museum of the University of Palermo.

== Biography ==
Theodosio De Stefani Perez was born in the family castle in Santa Ninfa (Trapani) in southwestern Sicily, then in the Kingdom of the Two Sicilies on 6 February 1853.

He was a son of don Mariano De Stefani Falco and donna Ippolita Perez. He was the fourth of seven children. The father was the scion of a wealthy family of landowners, while the mother was a descendant of the Prince of Carloforte and heir to great wealth, but not the noble title.

He completed his primary studies at the College of San Rocco, later he served voluntary military service until 1873 and at the end of this period he finished his studies.

He became professor of entomology at the University of Palermo and in 1889 was appointed Chief of Phytopathology for Sicily. He was a member of many scientific academies and entomological and environmental associations.

He learned the art of embalming and preservation of animals and contributed to establish the University Museum of Zoology and Comparative Anatomy of Palermo.

He openly professed secularist, libertarian and antifascist ideas and adhered to Freemasonry, where he held the highest degree of Worshipful Master, facts that led to his being ostracised by the fascist regime.

Not interested in money, he did not draw his university salary for almost thirty years. Later he withdrew all his money at one time, but it was not enough to save him from the economic collapse, with the loss of almost all of the family assets.

He died in on 25 February 1935 at Giacalone, Palermo, aged 82.

== The Entomologist ==
Theodosio De Stefani Perez mainly applied himself to the study of Hymenoptera Chalcididae and their galls, with particular attention to their relation with the host plants and the agricultural processes.

He produced more than 180 works between 1881 and 1929, published in various Italian and foreign magazines, especially German.

He was a pioneer in the study of the Hymenoptera, but this was not confined to their external descriptions and systematics, as was the common practise of the scientists of his time. In fact he was seeking an understanding of biological phenomena and function of species in their natural environment, dealing with their biology, ecology and behaviour. Among his works, about 40 deal with the Hymenoptera Chalcididae and the production of galls. He described about one hundred species of Hymenoptera, many of them still considered valid species.

He also devoted himself to the study of Coleoptera and Orthoptera, and to the Ornithology and fauna of Sicily.

In 1893 he produced the first descriptive catalog of the European species of Hymenoptera. In the early 1900s he also devoted himself to the study of the Hymenoptera of Tripolitania and East Africa.

== Works ==
partial list

- 1882 Notizie imenotterologiche. Il Naturalista siciliano, 2: 55–58.
- 1883 Miscellanea imenotterologica. Il Naturalista siciliano, 2: 280–284.
- 1884 Imenotteri nuovi o poco conosciuti della Sicilia. Il Naturalista Siciliano, 3: 153–158.
- 1885 Imenotteri nuovi o poco conosciuti della Sicilia. Il Naturalista Siciliano 4: 185–189.
- 1886 Raccolte imenotterologiche sui Monti di Renda e loro adiacenze. Il Naturalista siciliano 5: 181–186.
- 1887 Un nuovo genere di Crabronidi ed altri Imenotteri nuovi o poco cogniti raccolti in Sicilia. Il Naturalista Siciliano, 6: 85–90.
- 1887 due nuovi Ichneumoni di Sicilia. Il Naturalista Siciliano, 7: 53–54.
- 1889 Miscellanea imenotterologica sicula. Il Naturalista Siciliano 8: 140–145
- 1889 I Cinipidi e le loro galle. In 4to, offp., pp. 6. Atti Reale Accademia di Scienze, Lettere e Belle Arti di Palermo, Nuova Serie vol. 10. Teodosio De Steafno fu un insigne naturalista e geologo
- 1894 Imenotteri di Sicilia raccolti nel territorio di Santa Ninfa in provincia di Trapani. Il Naturalista siciliano,13: 199–203; 211–219.
- 1895 Catalogo degli Imenotteri di Sicilia. Il Naturalista Siciliano, 14: 169–182
- 1898 Miscellanea entomologica sicula. Il Naturalista Siciliano (2) 2: 249–256.
- Riggio G., De Stefani-Perez T. 1888. Sopra alcuni Imenotteri dell'Isola di Ustica. Naturalista Siciliano 7: 145–150.
- Importante cattura ornitologica fatta in Sicilia.Palermo 1905
- Cavallette, loro invasioni e lotta contro di esse in Sicilia. Osservazioni fatte durante l'invasione della Provincia di Palermo negli anni 1901–1911 Published by Palermo, Colonia Agricola S. Martino, Palermo, Colonia Agricola S. Martino (1913)
