= Litargus didesmus =

Scientific classification
- Domain: Eukaryota
- Kingdom: Animalia
- Phylum: Arthropoda
- Class: Insecta
- Order: Coleoptera
- Suborder: Polyphaga
- Infraorder: Cucujiformia
- Family: Mycetophagidae
- Genus: Litargus
- Species: L. didesmus

Binomial name
- Litargus didesmus (Say, 1826)

Species of beetle

Litargus didesmus is a species of hairy fungus beetle in the family Mycetophagidae. It is found in North America.
