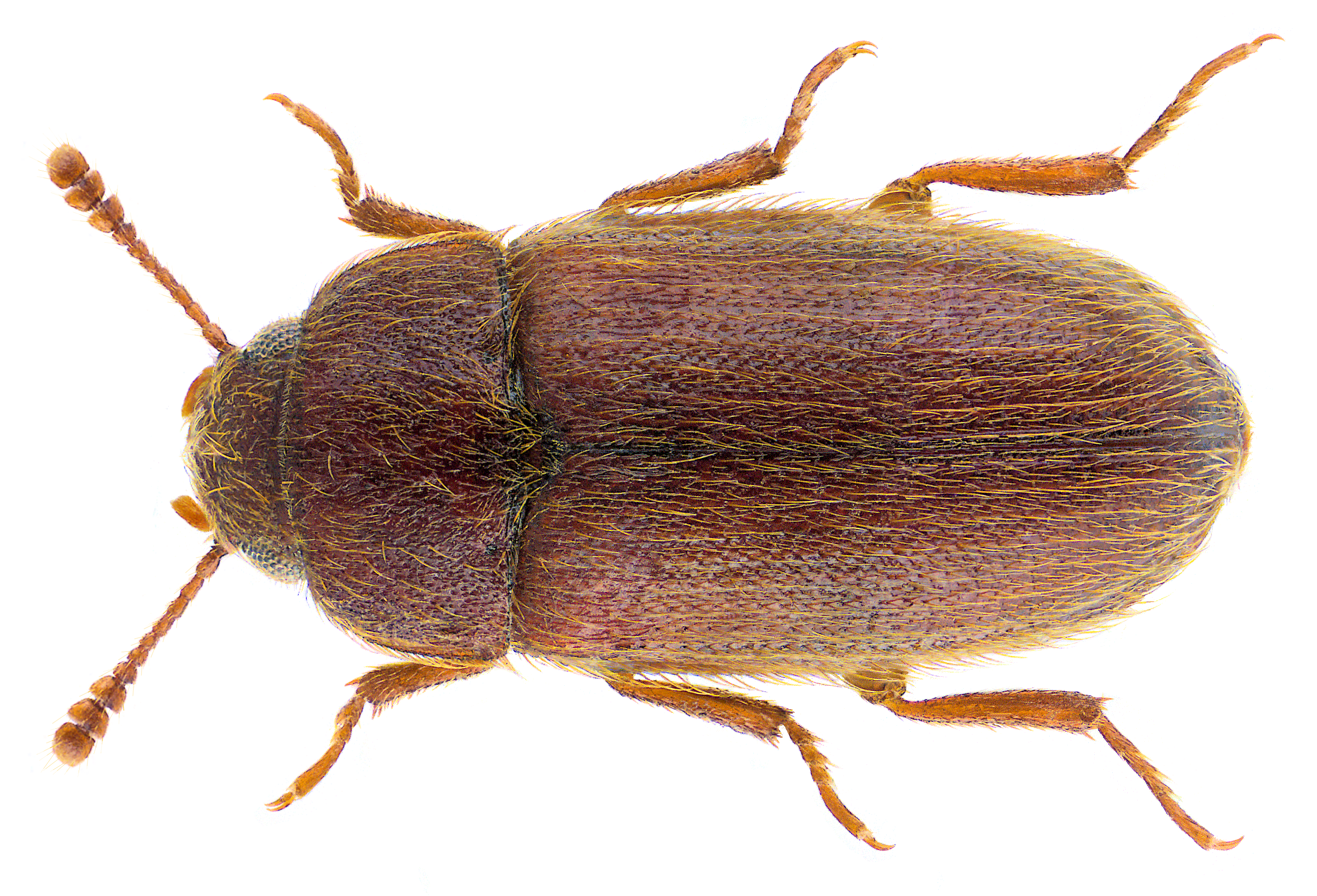

Scientific classification
- Kingdom: Animalia
- Phylum: Arthropoda
- Clade: Pancrustacea
- Class: Insecta
- Order: Coleoptera
- Suborder: Polyphaga
- Infraorder: Cucujiformia
- Family: Mycetophagidae
- Genus: Typhaea
- Species: T. stercorea

Binomial name
- Typhaea stercorea (Linnaeus, 1758)

= Typhaea stercorea =

Species of beetle

Typhaea stercorea is a cosmopolitan species of beetle of the family Mycetophagidae, known by the common name hairy fungus beetle.

== Description ==
Adult T. stercorea are 2.2–3.0 mm long, oval, brown, flattened, and have hairy elytra with parallel lines of fine hairs. Antennae are 3 segmented and the head is readily visible from above, distinguishing the hairy fungus beetle from some similar species. At 25 °C and 80-90 RH, development from egg to adult takes 21 to 33 days. The larvae are able to move easily and the adults can run fast and fly well. It is a generalist feeder associated with moldy or damp conditions. Its presence in stored grain indicates poor storage conditions. It is a minor pest of freshly harvested or slightly damp grain. Damage is not distinctive and is caused by both adult and larval feeding. Stored products consumed include: moldy cereals, tobacco, peanuts, and hay. The species also eats fungi that grow on damp food. This species has been found in grain storages dating back to the Iron Age.

== Habitat ==
The species can be found on ripening hay and grain crops before harvest in temperate and tropical areas.

== Disease vector ==
It was discovered in 1994 that this species can carry Salmonella enterica serovar Infantis. The species carried the bacterium into a Danish broiler house that infected 39,900 newly hatched chicks. The chicks were infected by eating the beetles. A study of species of beetles in broiler houses, including this species, showed that the beetles that are in broiler houses are likely to carry Salmonella. The research also showed that the species can carry Salmonella enterica and Campylobacter spp.
