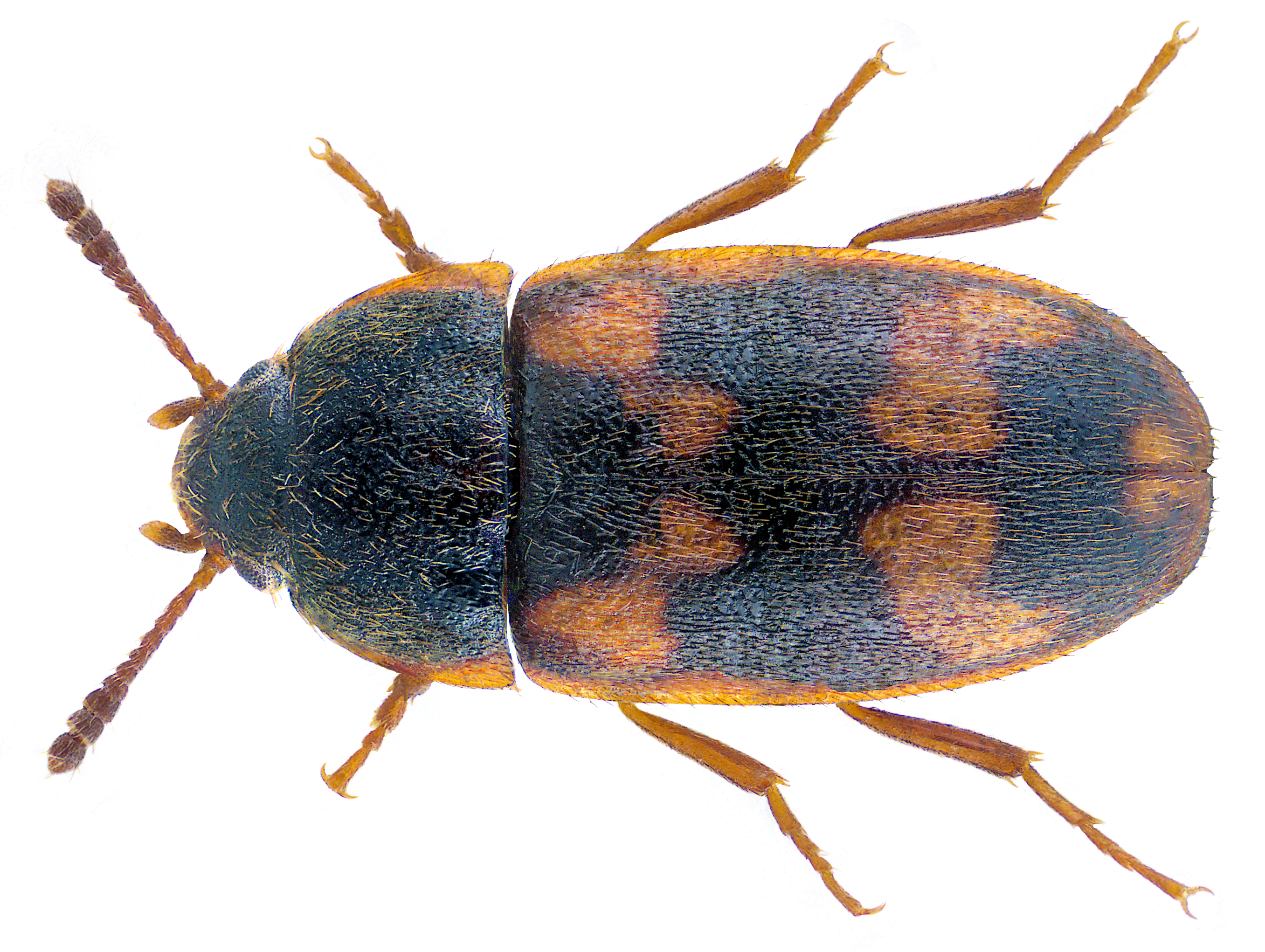

Scientific classification
- Kingdom: Animalia
- Phylum: Arthropoda
- Class: Insecta
- Order: Coleoptera
- Suborder: Polyphaga
- Infraorder: Cucujiformia
- Family: Mycetophagidae
- Genus: Litargus
- Species: L. connexus

Binomial name
- Litargus connexus (Geoffroy, 1785)

= Litargus connexus =

Species of beetle

Litargus connexus is a species of beetle belonging to the family Mycetophagidae.

It is native to Europe and Northern America. The larvae feeds mainly on fungi belonging to the species Daldinia loculata and Daldinia concentric and more generally on Pyrenomycetes. The adult is found in rotten wood, especially if attacked by fungal decomposers.
