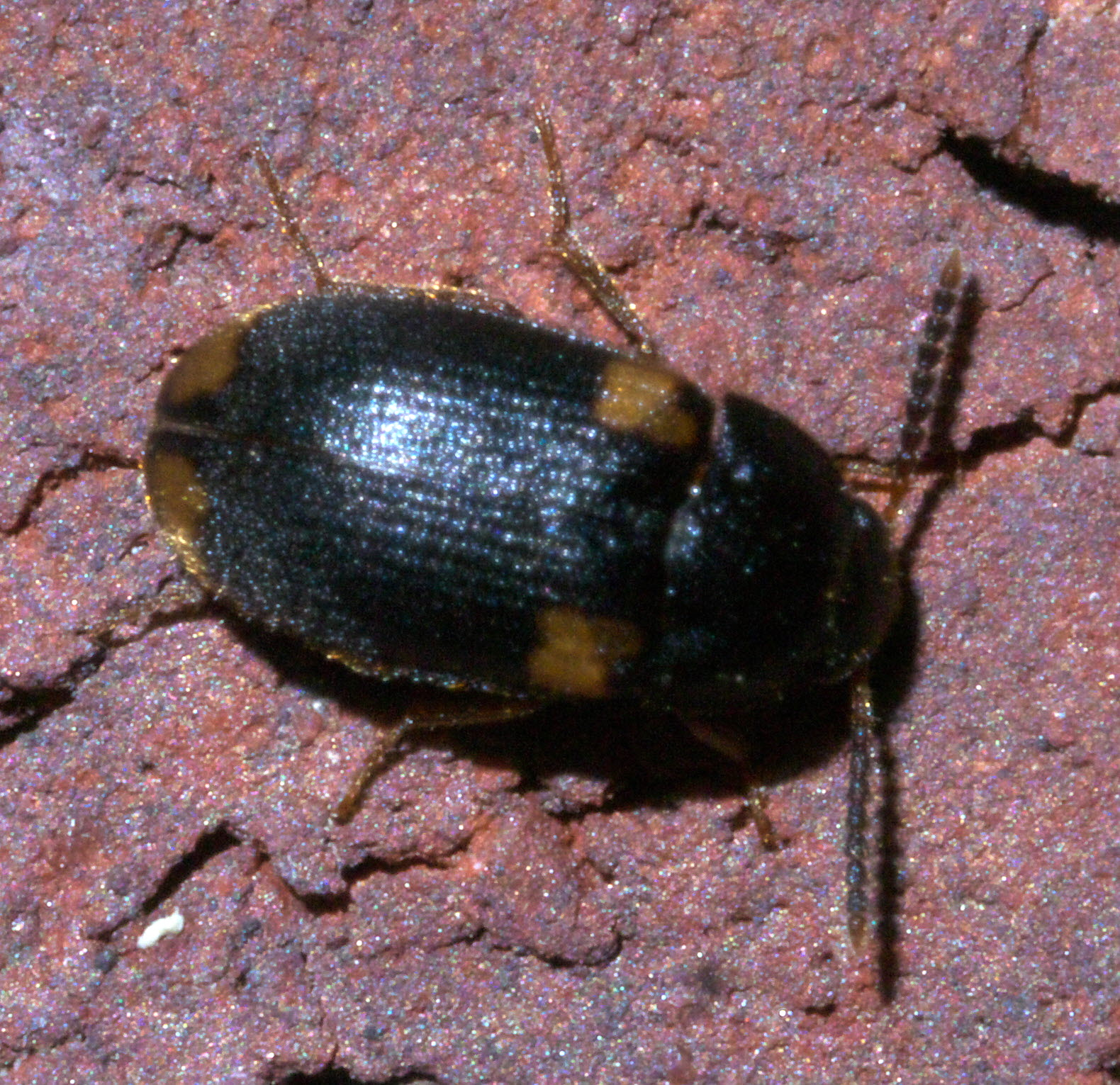

Scientific classification
- Kingdom: Animalia
- Phylum: Arthropoda
- Class: Insecta
- Order: Coleoptera
- Suborder: Polyphaga
- Infraorder: Cucujiformia
- Family: Mycetophagidae
- Genus: Mycetophagus
- Species: M. serrulatus

Binomial name
- Mycetophagus serrulatus (Casey, 1900)

= Mycetophagus serrulatus =

Species of beetle

Mycetophagus serrulatus is a species of hairy fungus beetle in the family Mycetophagidae. It is found in North America.

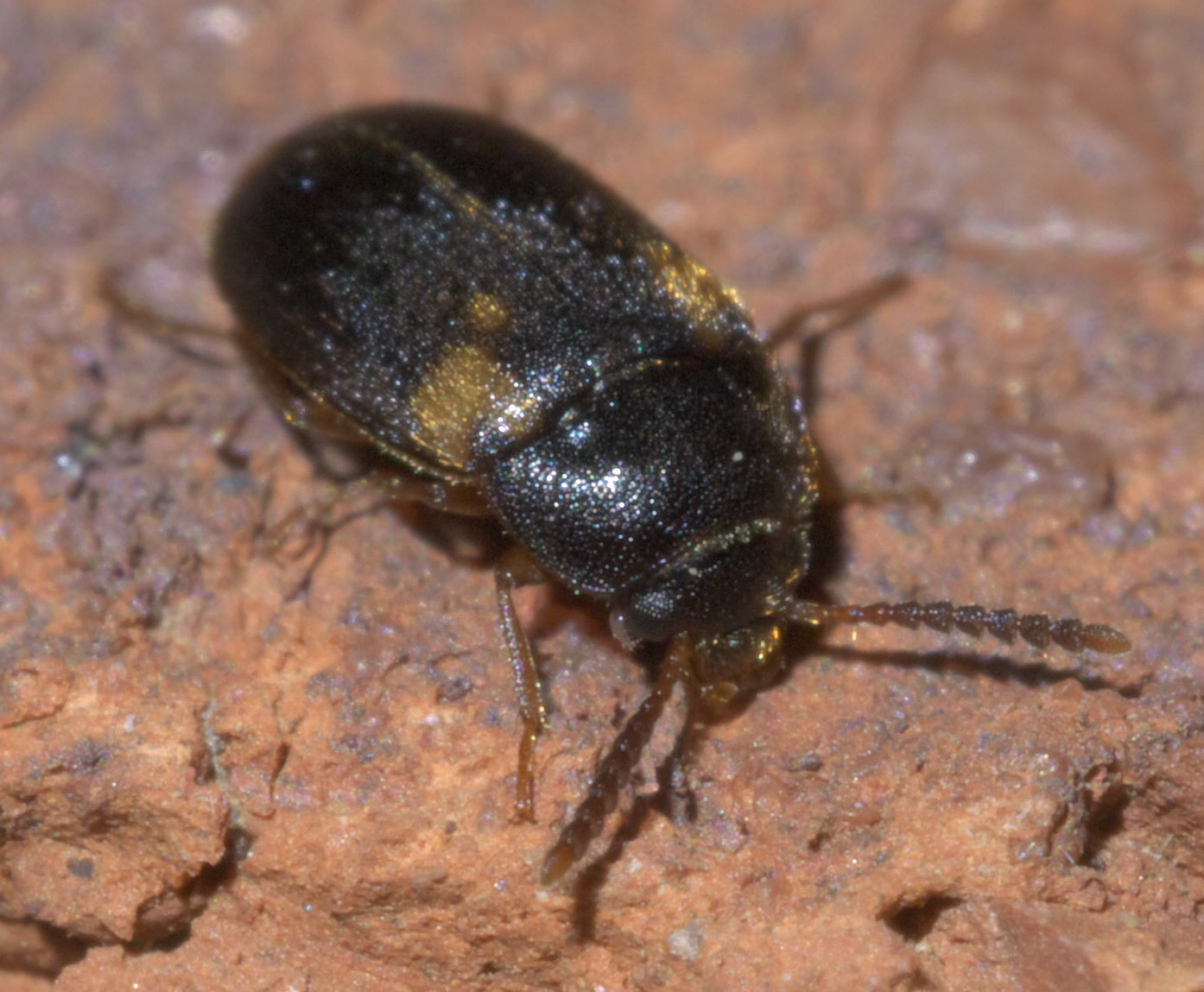
