= Litargus arjanbasui =

Scientific classification
- Kingdom: Animalia
- Phylum: Arthropoda
- Clade: Pancrustacea
- Class: Insecta
- Order: Coleoptera
- Suborder: Polyphaga
- Infraorder: Cucujiformia
- Family: Mycetophagidae
- Genus: Litargus
- Species: L. arjanbasui

Binomial name
- Litargus arjanbasui Háva & Chakrovorty , 2025

Species of hairy fungus beetles

Litargus arjanbasui is a species of hairy fungus beetles of family Mycetophagidae.

Currently known from West Bengal and Meghalaya states of India.

The species has been named in honour of nature conservationist Mr. Arjan Basu Roy, Secretary of the Nature Mates Nature Club in West Bengal, India, for his contribution in the field of butterfly conservation and ecotourism.
