= Litargus tetraspilotus =

Scientific classification
- Domain: Eukaryota
- Kingdom: Animalia
- Phylum: Arthropoda
- Class: Insecta
- Order: Coleoptera
- Suborder: Polyphaga
- Infraorder: Cucujiformia
- Family: Mycetophagidae
- Genus: Litargus
- Species: L. tetraspilotus

Binomial name
- Litargus tetraspilotus LeConte, 1856

Species of beetle

Litargus tetraspilotus is a species of hairy fungus beetle in the family Mycetophagidae. It is found in North America.
