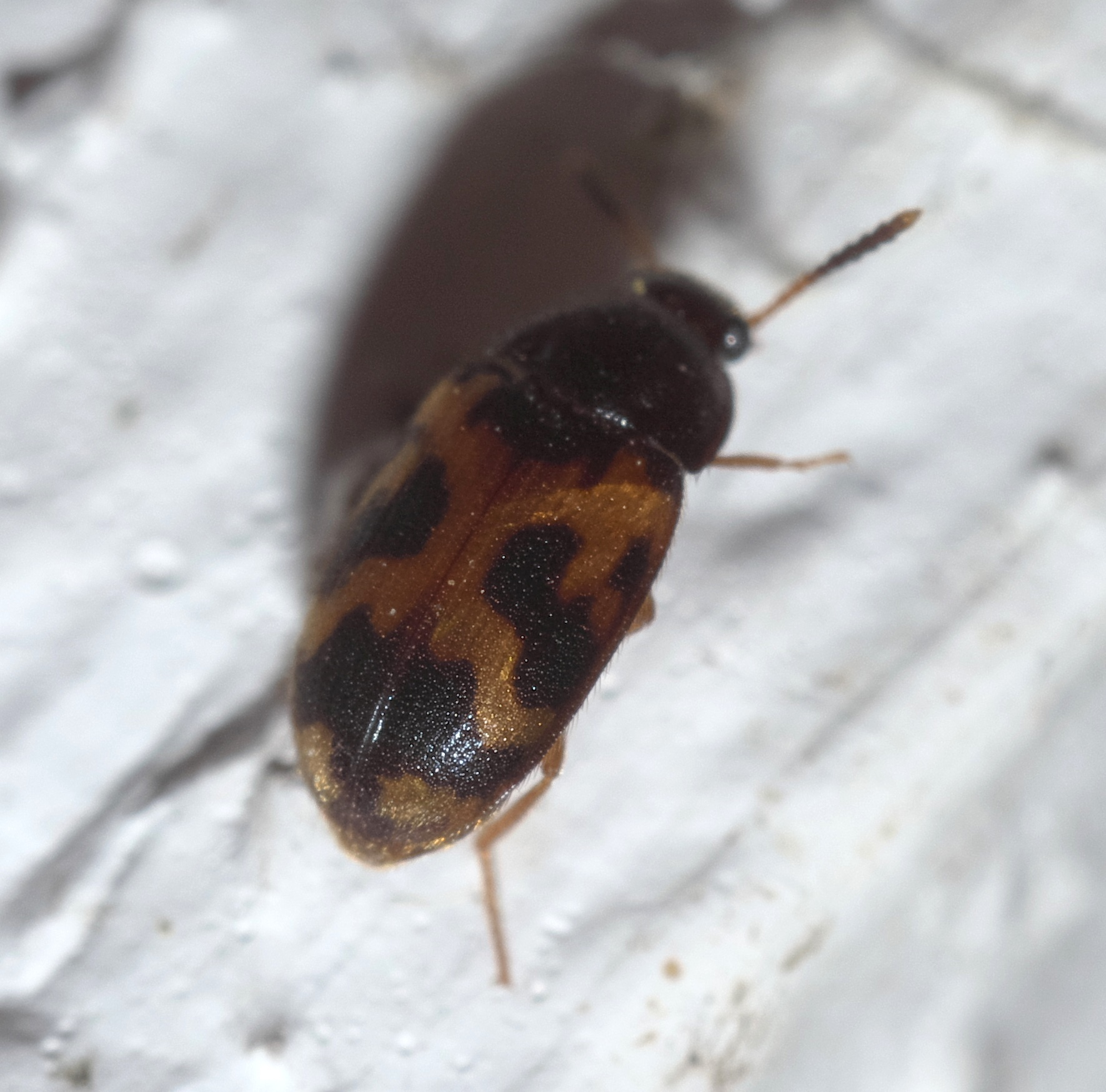
- Mycetophagus flexuosus, Oklahoma

Scientific classification
- Kingdom: Animalia
- Phylum: Arthropoda
- Clade: Pancrustacea
- Class: Insecta
- Order: Coleoptera
- Suborder: Polyphaga
- Infraorder: Cucujiformia
- Family: Mycetophagidae
- Genus: Mycetophagus
- Species: M. flexuosus

Binomial name
- Mycetophagus flexuosus Say, 1826

= Mycetophagus flexuosus =

Species of beetle

Mycetophagus flexuosus is a species of hairy fungus beetle in the family Mycetophagidae. It is found in North America. Species of host fungi include Pleurotus ostreatus, Trametes versicolor, and Piptoporus betulinus.
