= Eulagius acernus =

Scientific classification
- Kingdom: Animalia
- Phylum: Arthropoda
- Class: Insecta
- Order: Coleoptera
- Suborder: Polyphaga
- Infraorder: Cucujiformia
- Family: Mycetophagidae
- Genus: Eulagius
- Species: E. acernus

Binomial name
- Eulagius acernus Motschulsky, 1845

Synonyms
- Tritoma univestris Reitter, 1878

Species of beetle

Eulagius acernus is a species of beetle of the family Mycetophagidae. It is found in Armenia, Azerbaijan, Georgia and in the southern part of European Russia.
