= Mycetophagus melsheimeri =

Scientific classification
- Kingdom: Animalia
- Phylum: Arthropoda
- Class: Insecta
- Order: Coleoptera
- Suborder: Polyphaga
- Infraorder: Cucujiformia
- Family: Mycetophagidae
- Genus: Mycetophagus
- Species: M. melsheimeri

Binomial name
- Mycetophagus melsheimeri LeConte, 1856

Species of beetle

Mycetophagus melsheimeri is a species of hairy fungus beetle in the family Mycetophagidae. It is found in North America.
