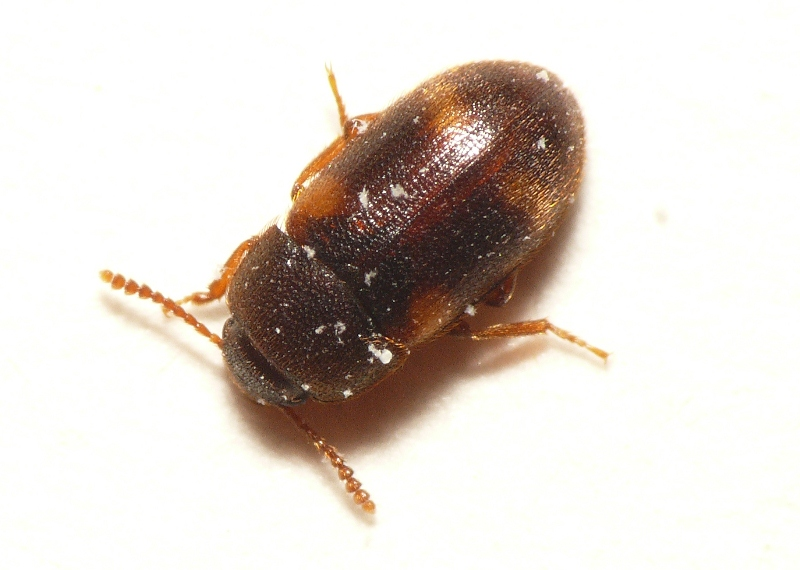

Scientific classification
- Kingdom: Animalia
- Phylum: Arthropoda
- Class: Insecta
- Order: Coleoptera
- Suborder: Polyphaga
- Infraorder: Cucujiformia
- Family: Mycetophagidae
- Genus: Mycetophagus
- Species: M. quadriguttatus

Binomial name
- Mycetophagus quadriguttatus Müller in Germar, 1821

= Mycetophagus quadriguttatus =

Species of beetle

Mycetophagus quadriguttatus, known generally as the spotted hairy fungus beetle or four-spotted fungus beetle, is a species of hairy fungus beetle in the family Mycetophagidae. It is found in Africa, Australia, Europe and Northern Asia (excluding China), North America, and Southern Asia.
