= Berginus pumilus =

Scientific classification
- Kingdom: Animalia
- Phylum: Arthropoda
- Clade: Pancrustacea
- Class: Insecta
- Order: Coleoptera
- Suborder: Polyphaga
- Infraorder: Cucujiformia
- Family: Mycetophagidae
- Genus: Berginus
- Species: B. pumilus

Binomial name
- Berginus pumilus LeConte, 1863

Species of beetle

Berginus pumilus is a species of hairy fungus beetle in the family Mycetophagidae. It is found in Central America and North America.
