= Typhaeola vicina =

Scientific classification
- Kingdom: Animalia
- Phylum: Arthropoda
- Class: Insecta
- Order: Coleoptera
- Suborder: Polyphaga
- Infraorder: Cucujiformia
- Family: Mycetophagidae
- Genus: Typhaeola
- Species: T. vicina

Binomial name
- Typhaeola vicina (Grouvelle, 1908)

Synonyms
- Atritomus vicinus Grouvelle, 1908

Species of beetle

Typhaeola vicina is a species of beetle of the family Mycetophagidae. It is found in Ethiopia.

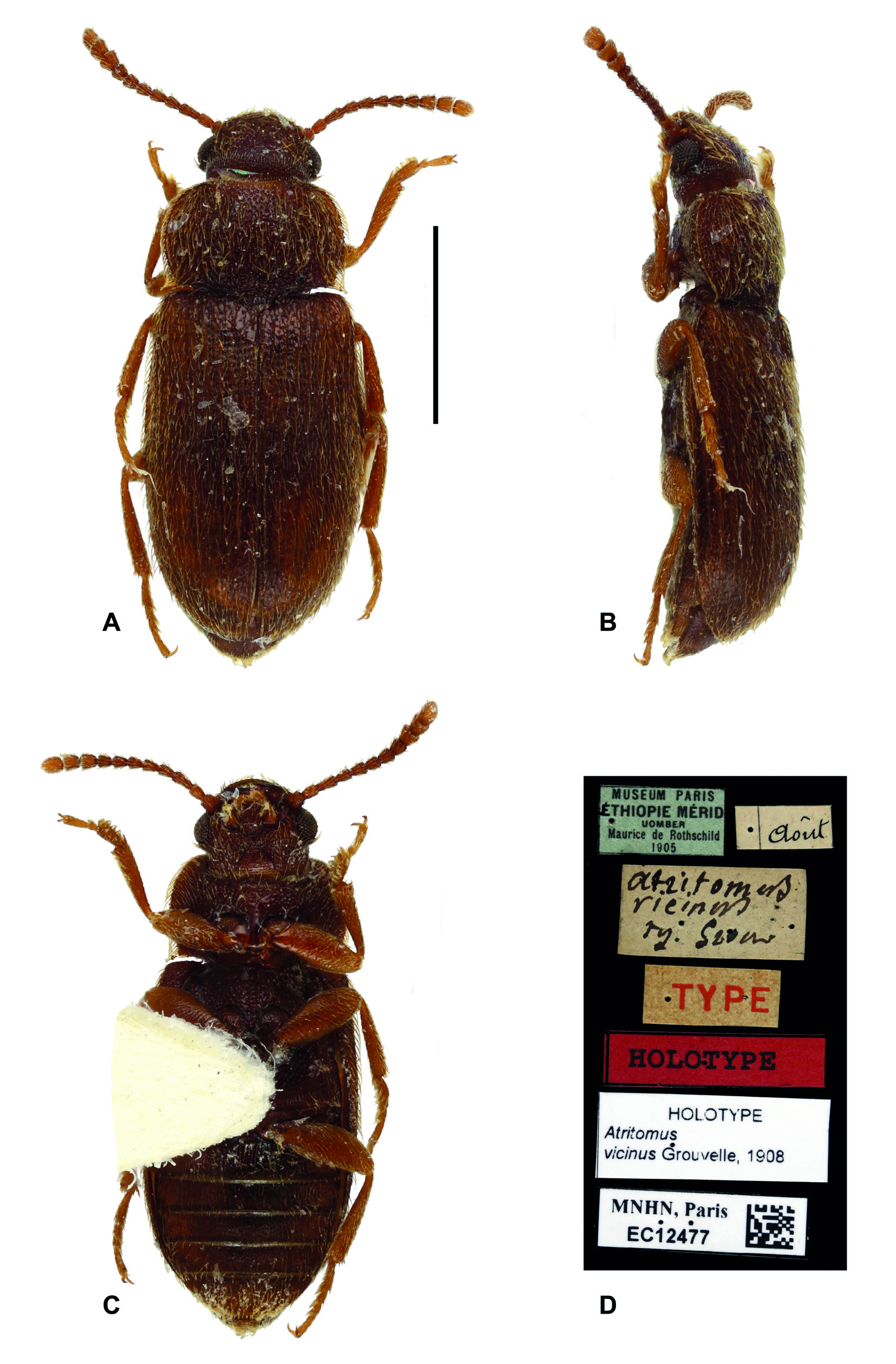
Atritomus vicinus Grouvelle, 1908 (= Typhaeola vicina (Grouvelle, 1908) comb. nov.), holotype (EC12477). A. Habitus, dorsal view. B. Habitus, lateral view. C. Habitus, ventral view. D. Labels. Scale bar = 1 mm.
