= Berginus nigricolor =

Scientific classification
- Domain: Eukaryota
- Kingdom: Animalia
- Phylum: Arthropoda
- Class: Insecta
- Order: Coleoptera
- Suborder: Polyphaga
- Infraorder: Cucujiformia
- Family: Mycetophagidae
- Genus: Berginus
- Species: B. nigricolor

Binomial name
- Berginus nigricolor Champion, 1913

Species of beetle

Berginus nigricolor is a species of hairy fungus beetle in the family Mycetophagidae. It is found in Central America and North America.
