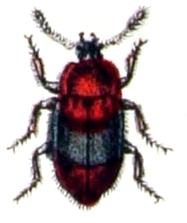
- Triphyllus bicolor

Scientific classification
- Kingdom: Animalia
- Phylum: Arthropoda
- Class: Insecta
- Order: Coleoptera
- Suborder: Polyphaga
- Infraorder: Cucujiformia
- Family: Mycetophagidae
- Genus: Triphyllus; Dejean, 1821

= Triphyllus =

Genus of beetles

Triphyllus is a genus of beetles belonging to the family Mycetophagidae.

Species:

- Triphyllus bicolor
