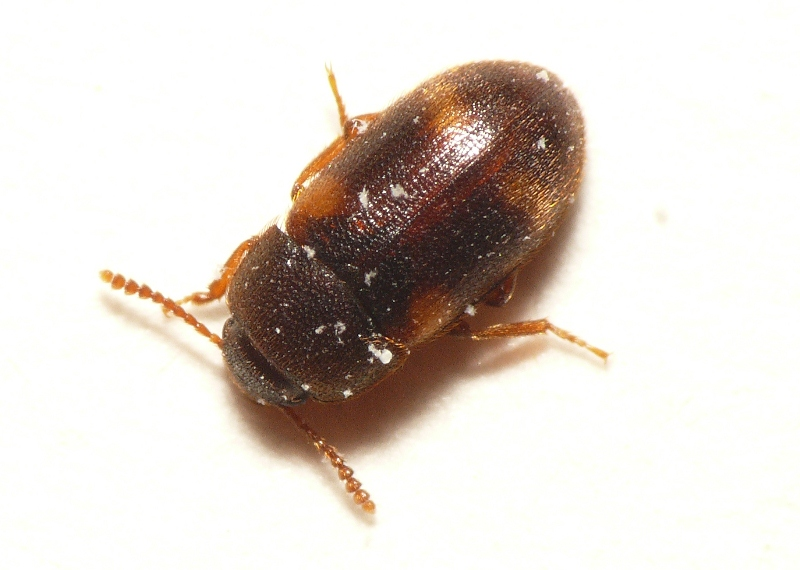
- Mycetophagus quadriguttatus

Scientific classification
- Kingdom: Animalia
- Phylum: Arthropoda
- Class: Insecta
- Order: Coleoptera
- Suborder: Polyphaga
- Infraorder: Cucujiformia
- Family: Mycetophagidae
- Subfamily: Mycetophaginae
- Genus: Mycetophagus; Hellwig in Schneider, 1792

Synonyms
- List: Arnoldiellus Nikitsky, 1989; Boletaria Marsham, 1802; Calilendus Reitter, 1911; Gratusus Casey, 1900; Ilendus Casey, 1900; Micetophagus Hellwig, 1792; Micetophagus Lamarck, 1801; Micromycetophagus Nikitsky, 2007; Mycetophagoides Nikitsky, 1988; Mycetoxides Motschoulsky, 1858; Paramycetophagus Nikitsky, 2007; Parilendus Casey, 1900; Philomyces Ganglbauer, 1899; Silphoides Herbst, 1783; Ulolendus Reitter, 1911

= Mycetophagus =

Genus of beetles

Mycetophagus is a genus of hairy fungus beetles in the family Mycetophagidae. There are at least 20 described species in Mycetophagus.

ITIS Taxonomic notes:

- The name Mycetophagus appeared in two or three separate works in 1792, one by Hellwig (in Schneider Neuest Mag. Ent., 1:394), and two by Fabricius (Entomologiae Systematicae, Emendatae et Auctae, Tom. I, Pars II:497; and Determinatio generis Ips affiniumque, Actes de la Société d'Histoire Naturelle de Paris 1:30). Hellwig appears to be the most frequently cited author, so for the moment ITIS will cite Hellwig. Further work would be required to determine earliest available authorship for the genus.
- There is apparently some confusion about subgenera in Mycetophagus. Parsons (1975:94) notes that "Casey's subgenera are not entirely natural and are used here chiefly for convenience in keying to species." Until further research clarifies this issue, ITIS has opted to omit subgenera in this genus.

As discussed by Löbl and Smetana (2011 p21), Hellwig (1792 p408) cited the correct page and number for the genus Lyctus in the second part of Fabricius’ book, demonstrating that he had Fabricius’ book in front of him. As such, Fabricius 1792 clearly has priority over Hellwig 1792 and should be cited as the author of this genus.

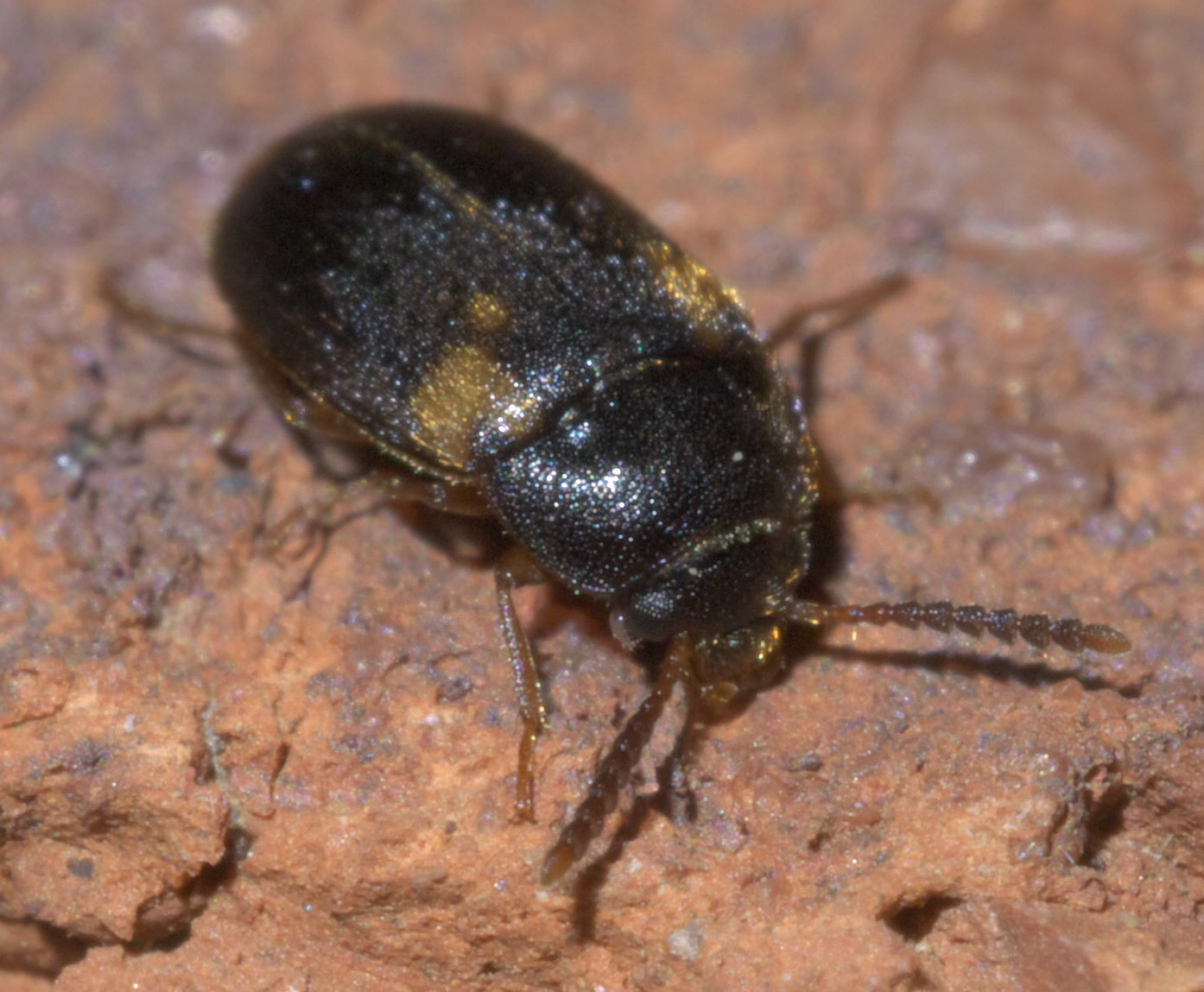
Mycetophagus serrulatus

== Species ==
The following species are recognised in the genus Mycetophagus:

- Mycetophagus akitai M. SAITÔ 2013
- Mycetophagus alni Champion, 1917
- Mycetophagus amamianus Nakane, 1989
- Mycetophagus ancora (Reitter, 1884)
- Mycetophagus antennatus (Reitter, 1879)
- Mycetophagus ater (Reitter, 1879)^{g}
- Mycetophagus atomarius (Fabricius, 1787)^{g}
- Mycetophagus bifasciatus Champion, 1919
- Mycetophagus californicus Horn, 1878^{i c b}
- Mycetophagus ciscaucasicus (Semenov, 1899)
- Mycetophagus confusus Horn, 1878^{i c g b}
- Mycetophagus decempunctatus Fabricius, 1801^{g}
- Mycetophagus distinctus Hatch, 1962^{i c g b}
- Mycetophagus elongatus (Reitter, 1889)
- †Mycetophagus exterminatus Wickham, 1913^{g}
- Mycetophagus flexuosus Say, 1826^{i c b}
- Mycetophagus fulvicollis Fabricius, 1792^{g}
- Mycetophagus grandis (Reitter, 1889)
- Mycetophagus hiranoi M. SAITÔ 2013
- Mycetophagus hillerianus Reitter, 1877
- Mycetophagus hyrcanicus Nikitsky, 1989
- Mycetophagus incognitus Nikitsky, 1988
- Mycetophagus infulatus (Reitter, 1884)
- Mycetophagus irroratus (Reitter, 1879)
- Mycetophagus lederi (Reitter, 1897)
- Mycetophagus livshitzi Nikitsky, 1988
- Mycetophagus melsheimeri LeConte, 1856^{i c g b}
- Mycetophagus multipunctatus Fabricius, 1792^{g}
- Mycetophagus obscurus LeConte, 1856^{i c g}
- Mycetophagus obsoletesignatus Miyatake, 1968
- Mycetophagus obsoletus (Melsheimer, 1844)^{i c g b}
- Mycetophagus piceus (Fabricius, 1777)^{g}
- Mycetophagus pini Ziegler, 1845^{i c g}
- Mycetophagus pluriguttatus LeConte, 1856^{i c b}
- Mycetophagus pluripunctatus LeConte, 1856^{i c b}
- Mycetophagus populi Fabricius, 1798^{g}
- Mycetophagus praetermissus Parsons, 1975^{i c g}
- Mycetophagus punctatus Say, 1826^{i c b} (hairy fungus beetle)
- Mycetophagus pustulosus (Reitter, 1889)
- Mycetophagus quadriguttatus Müller in Germar, 1821^{i c b} (spotted hairy fungus beetle)
- Mycetophagus quadriornatus (Reitter, 1901)
- Mycetophagus quadripustulatus (Linnaeus, 1761)
- Mycetophagus ramosus Reitter, 1904
- Mycetophagus reitteri Nikitsky, 2008
- Mycetophagus salicis Brisout de Barneville, 1862^{g}
- Mycetophagus sauteri Grouvelle, 1913^{g}
- Mycetophagus serrulatus (Casey, 1900)^{i c b}
- Mycetophagus sulcicollis Champion, 1917
- Mycetophagus tauricus Pliguinsky, 1923
- Mycetophagus tenuifasciatus Horn, 1878^{i c b}
- Mycetophagus tschitscherini Reitter, 1897^{g}
- Mycetophagus weigeli Háva, 2020
- †Mycetophagus willistoni Wickham, 1913^{g}
- Mycetophagus yunnanus Háva, 2019
- BOLD:ACA9195 (Mycetophagus sp.)
- BOLD:ACQ6809 (Mycetophagus sp.)

Data sources: i = ITIS, c = Catalogue of Life, g = GBIF, b = Bugguide.net
