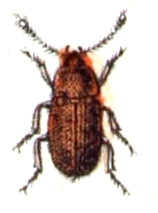
- Typhaea stercorea

Scientific classification
- Kingdom: Animalia
- Phylum: Arthropoda
- Clade: Pancrustacea
- Class: Insecta
- Order: Coleoptera
- Suborder: Polyphaga
- Infraorder: Cucujiformia
- Family: Mycetophagidae
- Genus: Typhaea; Stephens, 1829

= Typhaea =

Genus of beetles

Typhaea is a genus of beetles belonging to the family Mycetophagidae.

The genus was described in 1829 by James Francis Stephens.

Species:

- Typhaea africana Dajoz, 1970
- Typhaea angusta Rosenhauer, 1856
- Typhaea decipiens Lohse, 1989
- Typhaea hirta Broun, 1880
- Typhaea stercorea (Linnaeus, 1758)
