= Entoxylon =

Scientific classification
- Kingdom: Animalia
- Phylum: Arthropoda
- Class: Insecta
- Order: Coleoptera
- Suborder: Polyphaga
- Infraorder: Cucujiformia
- Superfamily: Tenebrionoidea
- Family: Mycetophagidae
- Genus: Entoxylon; Ancey, 1869

Synonyms
- Atritomus Reitter, 1877

Genus of beetles

Entoxylon is a genus of beetles belonging to the family Mycetophagidae.

== Species ==
- Entoxylon abeillei (Ancey, 1869)
- Entoxylon baudii Seidlitz, 1889
- Entoxylon besucheti Dajoz, 1964
- Entoxylon franzi Dajoz, 1964
- Entoxylon inexpectatus Dajoz, 1964
- Entoxylon martini Reitter, 1887

== Taxonomy ==
Entoxylon was treated as a synonym of Esarcus, but strongly differs from this genus, mainly in having the anterior edge of the pronotum straight, with the anterolateral angles blunt, never protruding forward, the scutellar shield visible, not concealed under the posterior margin of the pronotum, the elytral interstria, if present, flat (always present, convex, in Esarcus), pterothorax and abdomen lacking setose cavities, and other, less evident characters.
