= Stereophilus =

Scientific classification
- Kingdom: Animalia
- Phylum: Arthropoda
- Clade: Pancrustacea
- Class: Insecta
- Order: Coleoptera
- Suborder: Polyphaga
- Infraorder: Cucujiformia
- Superfamily: Tenebrionoidea
- Family: Mycetophagidae
- Genus: Stereophilus; Biscaccianti, Audisio & Esser, 2022
- Species: S. filicornis

Binomial name
- Stereophilus filicornis (Reitter, 1887)

Synonyms
- Atritomus filicornis Reitter, 1887; Atritomus boissyi Caillol, 1925

Genus of beetles

Stereophilus is a genus of leaf beetles in the family Mycetophagidae. It is monotypic, being represented by the single species, Stereophilus filicornis, which is found in western and southern Europe and western North Africa. The species was described from specimens collected in Algeria, and was later also reported from Belgium, France, Italy, Germany, The Netherlands, Spain and Tunisia.

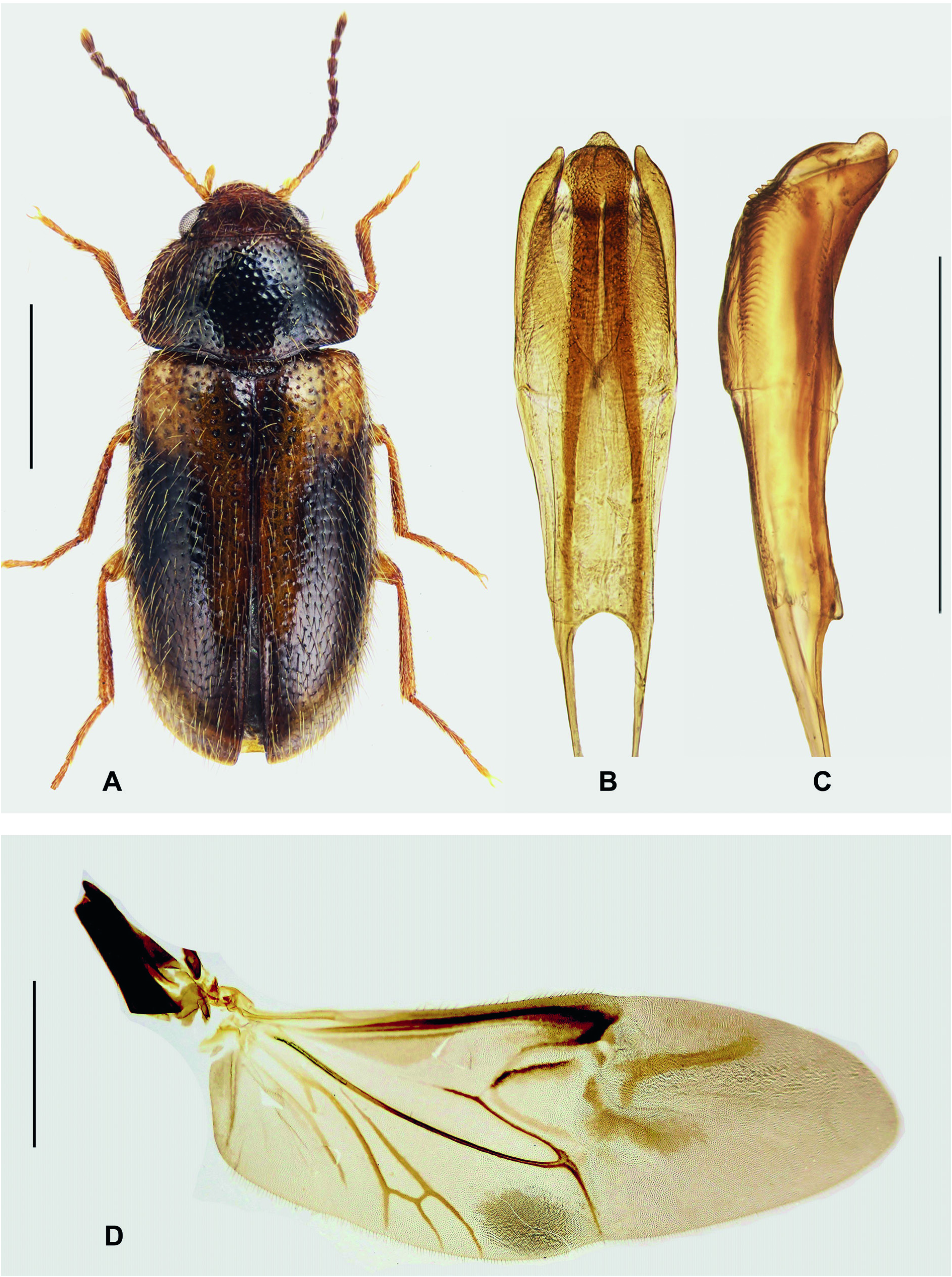
Stereophilus filicornis (Reitter, 1887), ♂ from Italy, Tuscany. A. Habitus. B. Aedeagus (dorsal view). C. Aedeagus (lateral view). D. Right hind wing of a male from France, Haute-Garonne. Scale bars: A, D = 1 mm; B–C = 0.5 mm.

== Description ==
A medium-sized mycetophagid, elongate, subparallel, slightly convex in lateral view, with shiny integument.

== Life history ==
The biology and ecology of are poorly known. Some authors report catches from under bark on dead trunks, on woody debris of old trees, and by beating dead branches of broadleaf trees such as Castanea sativa and Quercus species. A series of specimens was reared from carpophores of Stereum hirsutum, sampled from Fagus sylvatica. One specimen reported from southern Italy, Calabria (Aspromonte) was found by sifting wood mould, woody debris, and Daedaleopsis nitida carpophores, likely its local host fungus, collected from inside a large hollow on a Quercus suber trunk. The site is a mesophile cork oak mixed forest.

== Etymology ==
The genus is named after Stereum, the genus name of one of the fungi known as larval host of the included species, with addition of the Latin suffix -philus (meaning lover).
