= Eulagius =

Scientific classification
- Kingdom: Animalia
- Phylum: Arthropoda
- Class: Insecta
- Order: Coleoptera
- Suborder: Polyphaga
- Infraorder: Cucujiformia
- Superfamily: Tenebrionoidea
- Family: Mycetophagidae
- Genus: Eulagius; Motschulsky, 1845

Synonyms
- Parabaptistes Ganglbauer, 1899

Genus of beetles

Eulagius is a genus of beetles belonging to the family Mycetophagidae.

== Species ==
- Eulagius acernus Motschulsky, 1845
- Eulagius chinensis Nikitsky, 1996
- Eulagius dentatus Nikitsky, 1988
- Eulagius hyrcanicu Esser, Varandi & Farashiani, 2018
- Eulagius irregularis (Reitter, 1888)
- Eulagius lewisi (Reitter, 1889)
- Eulagius reitteri (Lewis, 1896)
- Eulagius ussuriensis Nikitsky, 1988

== Former species ==
- Eulagius filicornis (Reitter, 1877)
