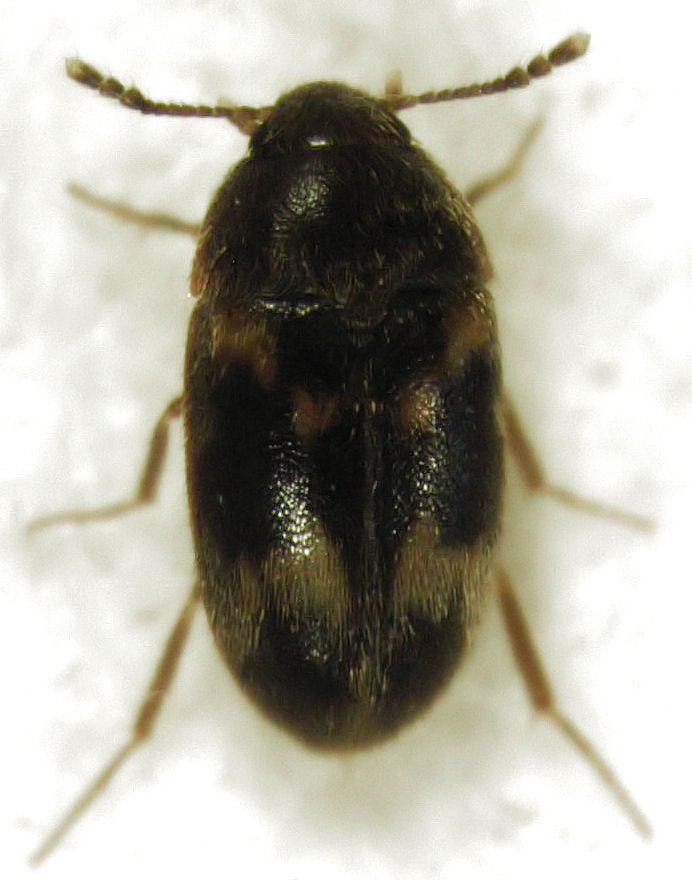
- Litargus balteatus

Scientific classification
- Kingdom: Animalia
- Phylum: Arthropoda
- Class: Insecta
- Order: Coleoptera
- Suborder: Polyphaga
- Infraorder: Cucujiformia
- Family: Mycetophagidae
- Genus: Litargus; Erichson, 1846

= Litargus =

Genus of beetles

Litargus is a genus of hairy fungus beetles in the family Mycetophagidae. There are at least 20 described species in Litargus.

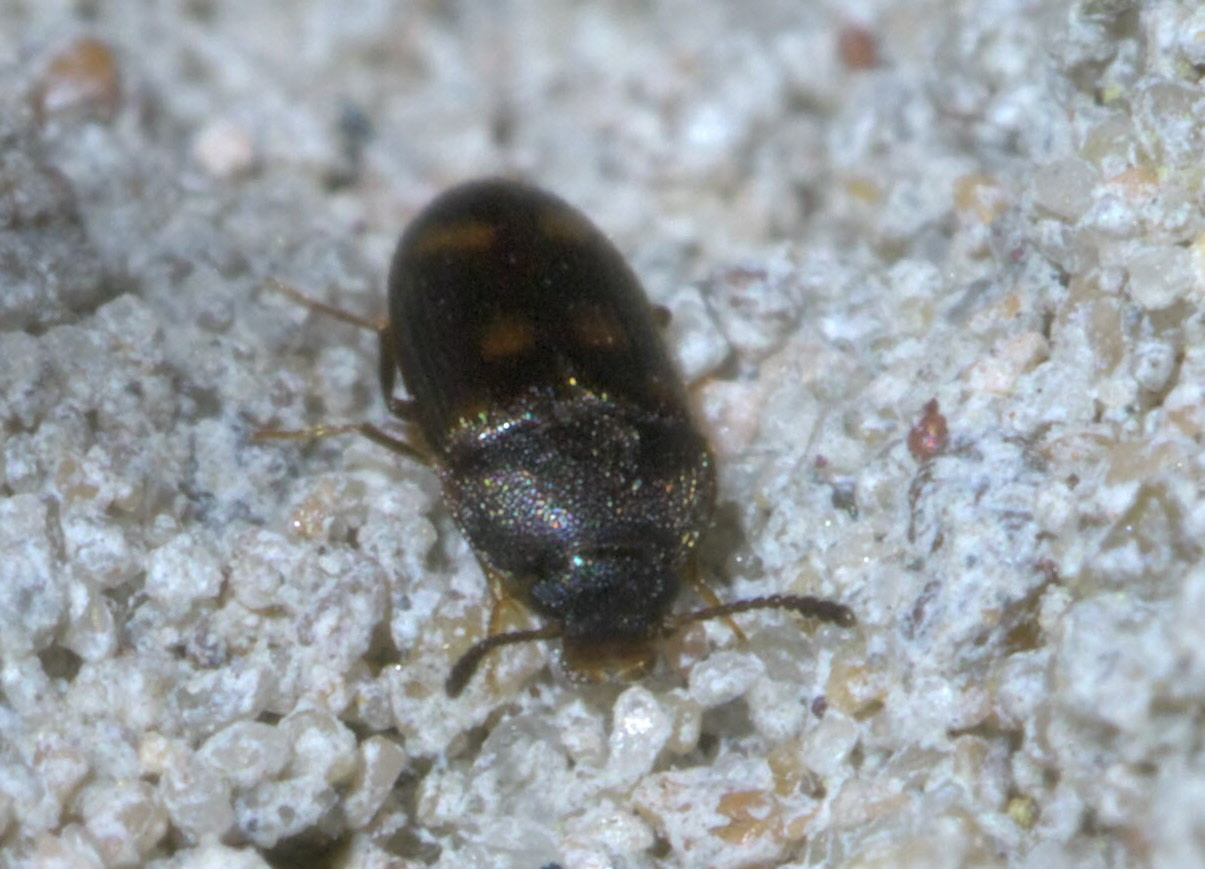
Litargus sexpunctatus

== Species ==
These 20 species belong to the genus Litargus:

- Litargus antennatus Miyatake, 1957
- Litargus arjanbasui Háva & Chakrovorty, 2025
- Litargus asperulus Casey
- Litargus balteatus LeConte, 1856 (stored grain fungus beetle)
- Litargus coloratus Rosenhauer, 1856
- Litargus connexus (Geoffroy, 1785)
- Litargus didesmus (Say, 1826)
- Litargus grandis Schaeffer, 1910
- Litargus guadalupensis Grouvelle & Raffray, 1908
- Litargus infulatus LeConte, 1856
- Litargus lewisi Reitter, 1889
- Litargus longulus Casey
- Litargus nebulosus LeConte, 1856
- Litargus nitidus Brèthes
- Litargus pallens Casey
- Litargus pilosus Wollaston, 1857
- Litargus sexpunctatus (Say, 1826)
- Litargus sexsignatus Miyatake, 1957
- Litargus tetraspilotus LeConte, 1856
- Litargus transversus LeConte, 1856
- Litargus vestitus Sharp, 1879
