= Berginus =

Scientific classification
- Kingdom: Animalia
- Phylum: Arthropoda
- Class: Insecta
- Order: Coleoptera
- Suborder: Polyphaga
- Infraorder: Cucujiformia
- Family: Mycetophagidae
- Subfamily: Bergininae
- Genus: Berginus; Erichson, 1846

Genus of beetles

Berginus is a genus of hairy fungus beetles in the family Mycetophagidae. There are at least three described species in Berginus.

== Species ==
These three species belong to the genus Berginus.

- Berginus bahamicus Casey, 1900
- Berginus nigricolor Champion, 1913
- Berginus pumilus LeConte, 1863
