= Typhaeola =

Scientific classification
- Kingdom: Animalia
- Phylum: Arthropoda
- Class: Insecta
- Order: Coleoptera
- Suborder: Polyphaga
- Infraorder: Cucujiformia
- Superfamily: Tenebrionoidea
- Family: Mycetophagidae
- Genus: Typhaeola; Ganglbauer, 1899

Genus of beetles

Typhaeola is a genus of beetles belonging to the family Mycetophagidae.

== Species ==
- Typhaeola aethiopica (Grouvelle, 1908)
- Typhaeola adamaouensis Esser, 2018
- Typhaeola brachati Esser, 2016
- Typhaeola capensis Esser, 2018
- Typhaeola curticollis (Fairmaire, 1879)
- Typhaeola fakoensis Esser, 2018
- Typhaeola limpopoensis Esser, 2018
- Typhaeola maculata (Perris, 1865)
- Typhaeola natalensis Esser, 2018
- Typhaeola umbrata (Baudi di Selve, 1870)
- Typhaeola vicina (Grouvelle, 1908)
