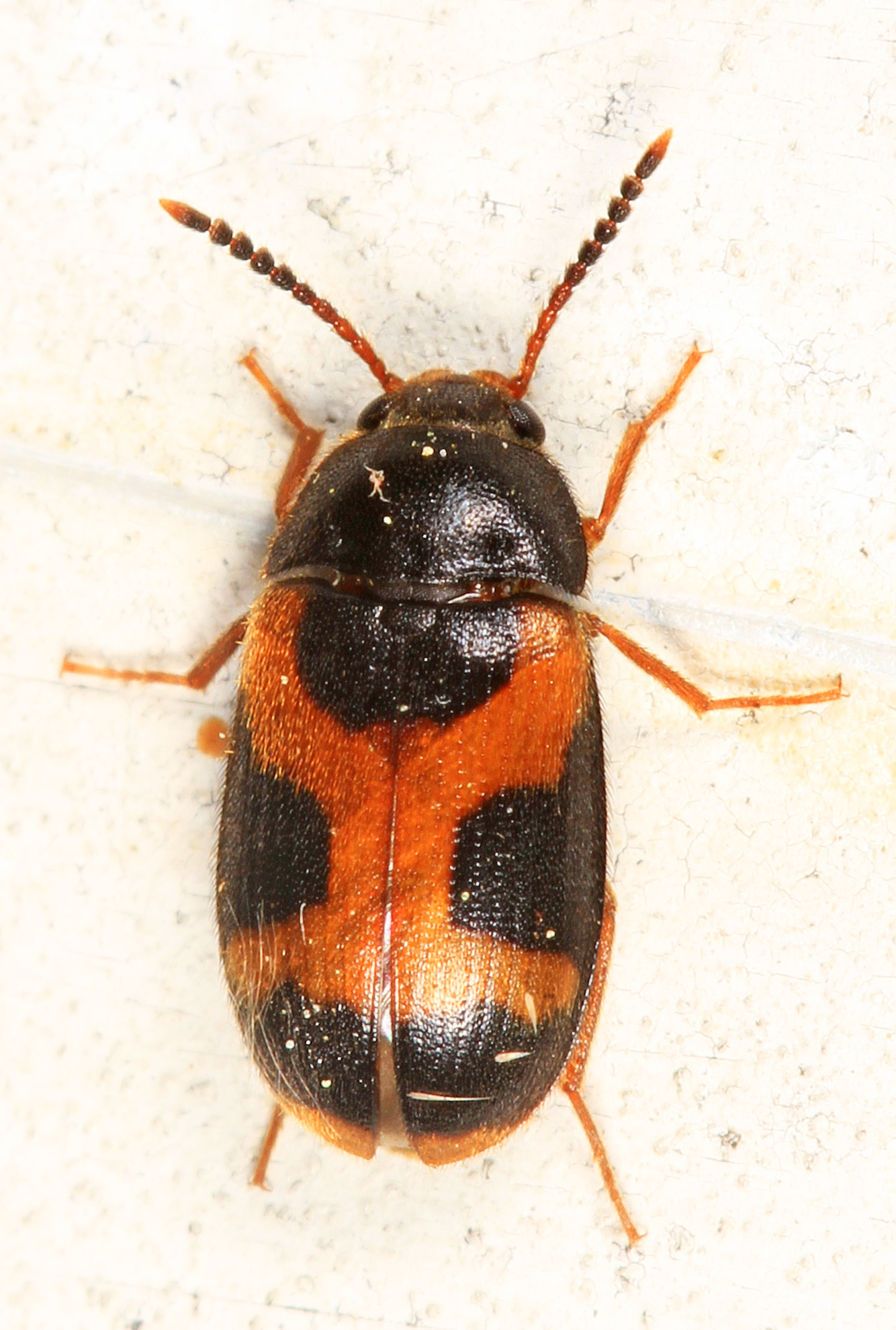

Scientific classification
- Kingdom: Animalia
- Phylum: Arthropoda
- Class: Insecta
- Order: Coleoptera
- Suborder: Polyphaga
- Infraorder: Cucujiformia
- Family: Mycetophagidae
- Genus: Mycetophagus
- Species: M. punctatus

Binomial name
- Mycetophagus punctatus Say, 1827

= Mycetophagus punctatus =

Species of beetle

Mycetophagus punctatus, the hairy fungus beetle, is a species of fungus beetle in the family Mycetophagidae. It occurs in North America. It can be found in households given the presence of decaying matter and sufficient dampness.

== Description ==
The hairy fungus beetle is 4.0 to 5.5 cm in body length and features red-yellow markings on its black elytra. Its antennae are red-brown becoming black nearing the tips. It features short hairs on its body.

== Ecology and behavior ==
Hairy fungus beetles typically proliferate during late summer to early fall in moist environments such as decaying plant material, cellars or houses, especially around bathtubs or sinks. They are also attracted to damp cereals, herbs, spices, cheese, fruit preserves, fibers, including carpet, and light sources, but do not cause any damage. The use of fungicides is known to limit their presence. They do not bite humans or spread any diseases.
