= Thrimolus =

Scientific classification
- Kingdom: Animalia
- Phylum: Arthropoda
- Clade: Pancrustacea
- Class: Insecta
- Order: Coleoptera
- Suborder: Polyphaga
- Infraorder: Cucujiformia
- Family: Mycetophagidae
- Genus: Thrimolus; Casey, 1900

Genus of beetles

Thrimolus is a genus of hairy fungus beetles in the family Mycetophagidae. There are at least two described species in Thrimolus.

== Species ==
These two species belong to the genus Thrimolus:

- Thrimolus duryi Casey
- Thrimolus minutus Casey, 1900
