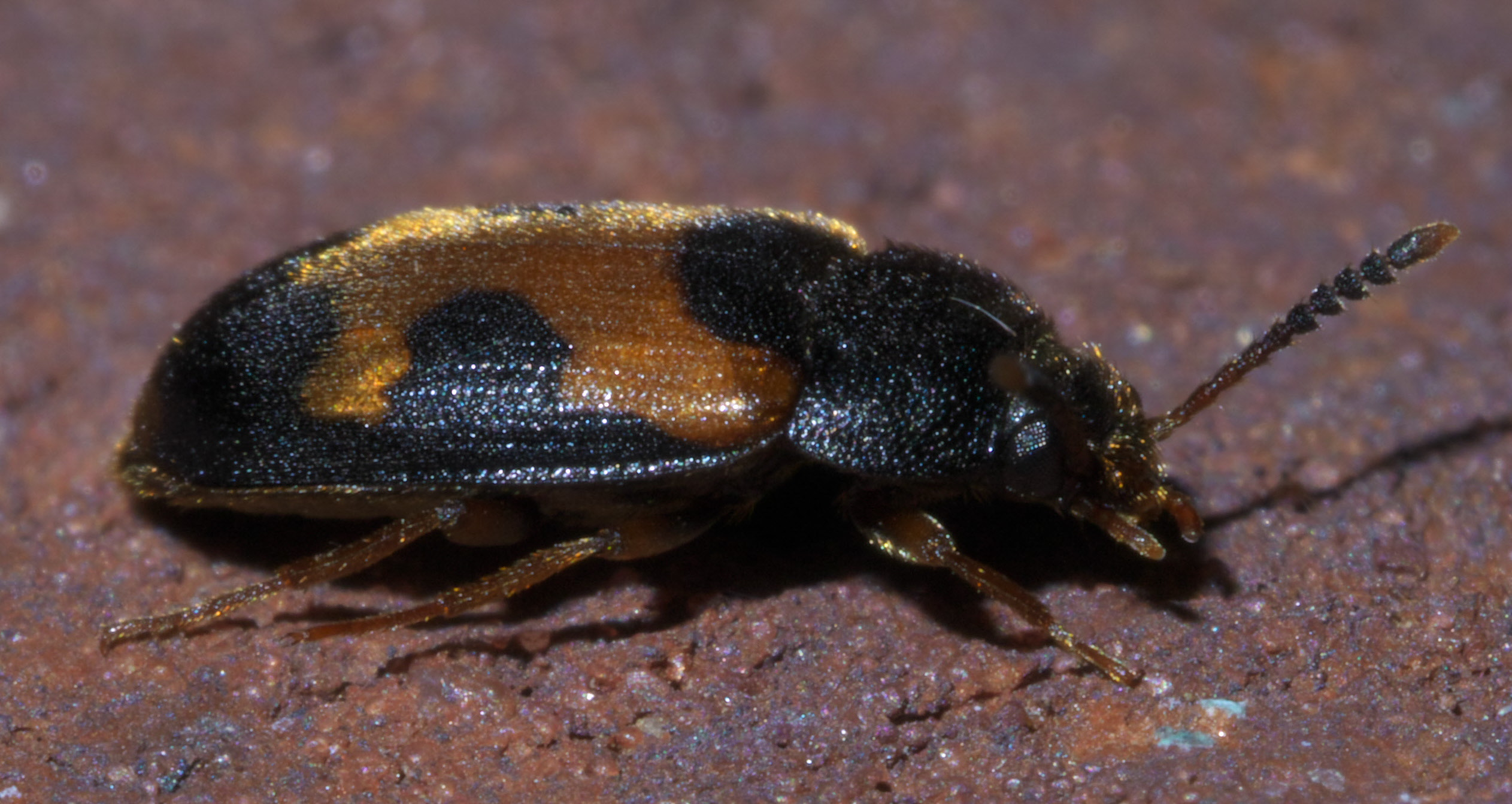
- Mycetophagus punctatus

Scientific classification
- Kingdom: Animalia
- Phylum: Arthropoda
- Clade: Pancrustacea
- Class: Insecta
- Order: Coleoptera
- Suborder: Polyphaga
- Infraorder: Cucujiformia
- Superfamily: Tenebrionoidea
- Family: Mycetophagidae (Leach, 1815)

= Mycetophagidae =

Family of beetles

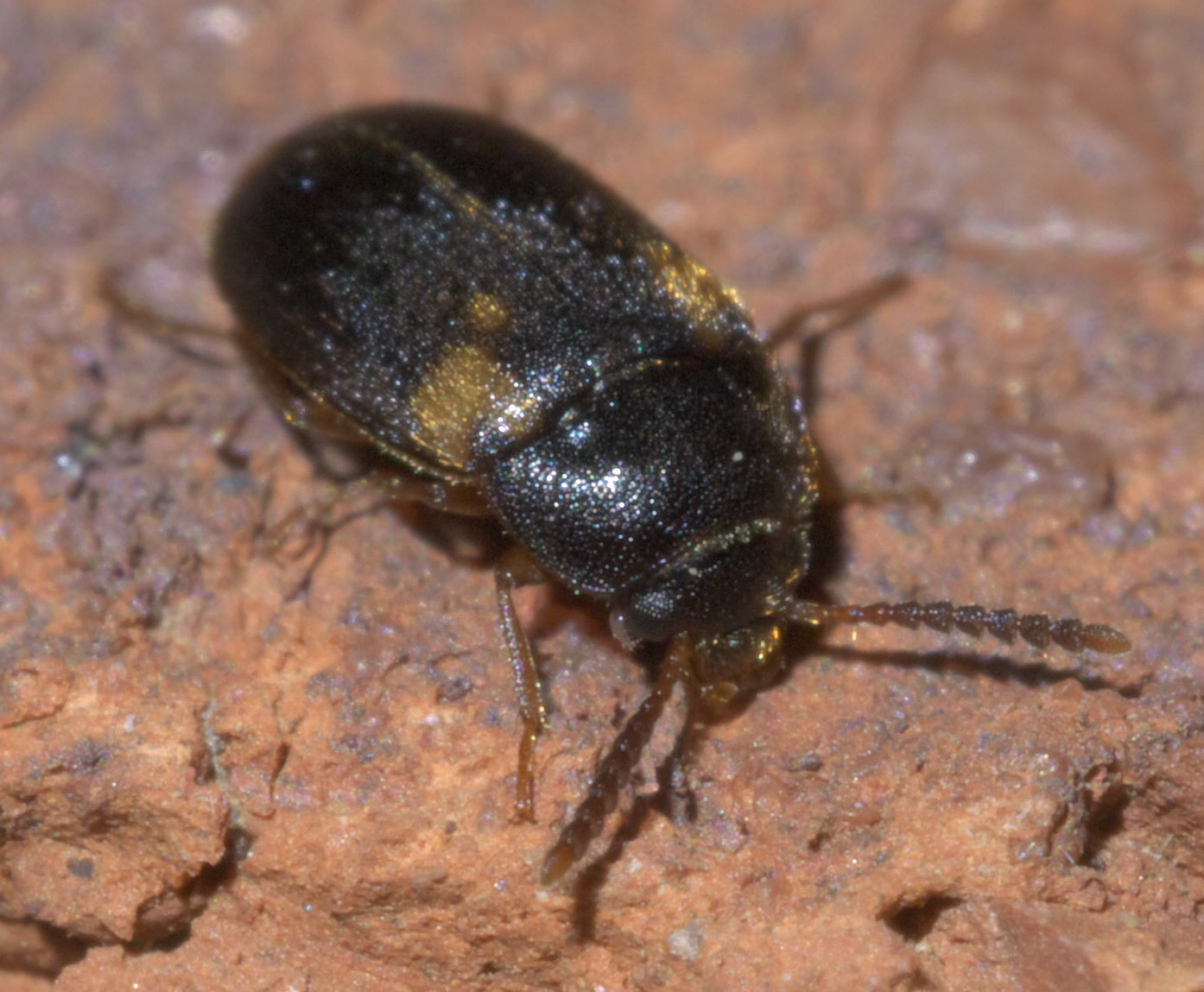
Mycetophagus serrulatus

The Mycetophagidae or hairy fungus beetles are a family of beetles in the superfamily Tenebrionoidea. The different species are between 1.0 and 6.5 mm in length. The larvae and adults live in decaying leaf litter, fungi, and under bark. Most species feed on fungi (hence the name). Worldwide, the 18 genera contain around 200 species.

== Genera ==
These 15 genera belong to the family Mycetophagidae:

- Afrotyphaeola Lawrence, Escalona, Leschen & Ślipiński, 2014^{g}
- Berginus Erichson, 1846^{i c g b}
- Crowsonium Abdullah, 1964^{g}
- Entoxylon Ancey, 1869
- Esarcus Reiche, 1864^{i c g}
- Eulagius Motschulsky, 1845^{g}
- Litargops Reitter, 1880^{g}
- Litargus Erichson, 1846^{i c g b}
- Mycetophagus Hellwig in Schneider, 1792^{i c g b}
- Nototriphyllus Lawrence, Escalona, Leschen & Ślipiński, 2014^{g}
- Pseudotriphyllus Reitter, 1880^{i c g}
- Stereophilus Biscaccianti, Audisio & Esser, 2022
- Thrimolus Casey, 1900^{i c g b}
- Triphyllus Dejean, 1821^{g}
- Typhaea Curtis, 1830^{i c g b}
- Typhaeola Ganglbauer, 1899^{g}
- Zeclaviger Lawrence, Escalona, Leschen & Ślipiński, 2014^{g}

Data sources: i = ITIS, c = Catalogue of Life, g = GBIF, b = Bugguide.net
