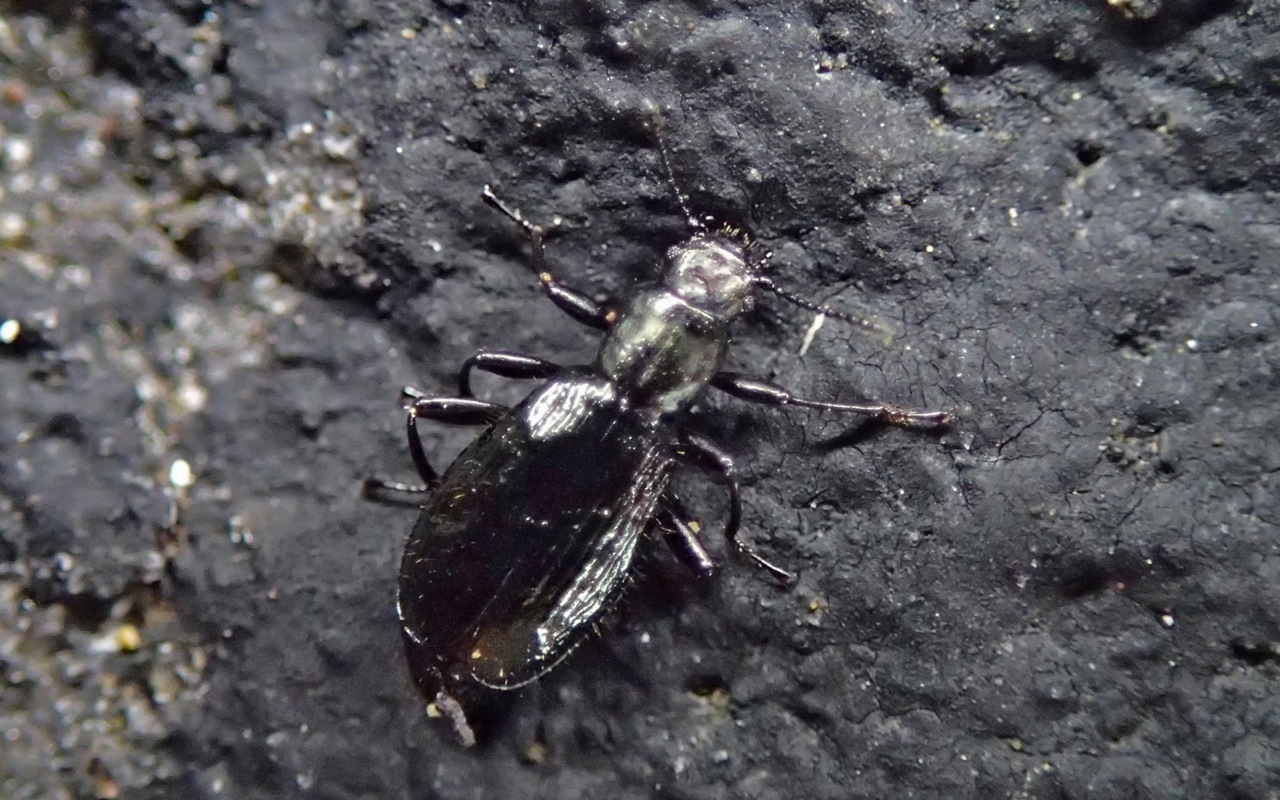
- Aegialites saintgeorgensis

Scientific classification
- Kingdom: Animalia
- Phylum: Arthropoda
- Clade: Pancrustacea
- Class: Insecta
- Order: Coleoptera
- Suborder: Polyphaga
- Infraorder: Cucujiformia
- Family: Salpingidae
- Subfamily: Aegialitinae; J.L. LeConte, 1862

Synonyms
- Eurystethinae Seidlitz, 1916

= Aegialitinae =

Subfamily of beetles

Aegialitinae is a subfamily of beetles in the family Salpingidae. There are currently 15 accepted species split between 2 genera. Aegialitinae was first described in 1862 by J.L. LeConte.

== Genera and species ==
Genus: Aegialites

- Aegialities alaskaensis
- Aegialites californicus
- Aegialites canadensis
- Aegialites charlottae
- Aegialites debilis
- Aegialites farallonensis
- Aegialites fuchsi
- Aegialites latus
- Aegialites longicornis
- Aegialites marinensis
- Aegialites saintgeorgensis
- Aegialites saintpaulensis
- Aegialites stejnegeri
- Aegialites subopacus

Genus: Antarcticodomus

- Antarcticodomus fallai
