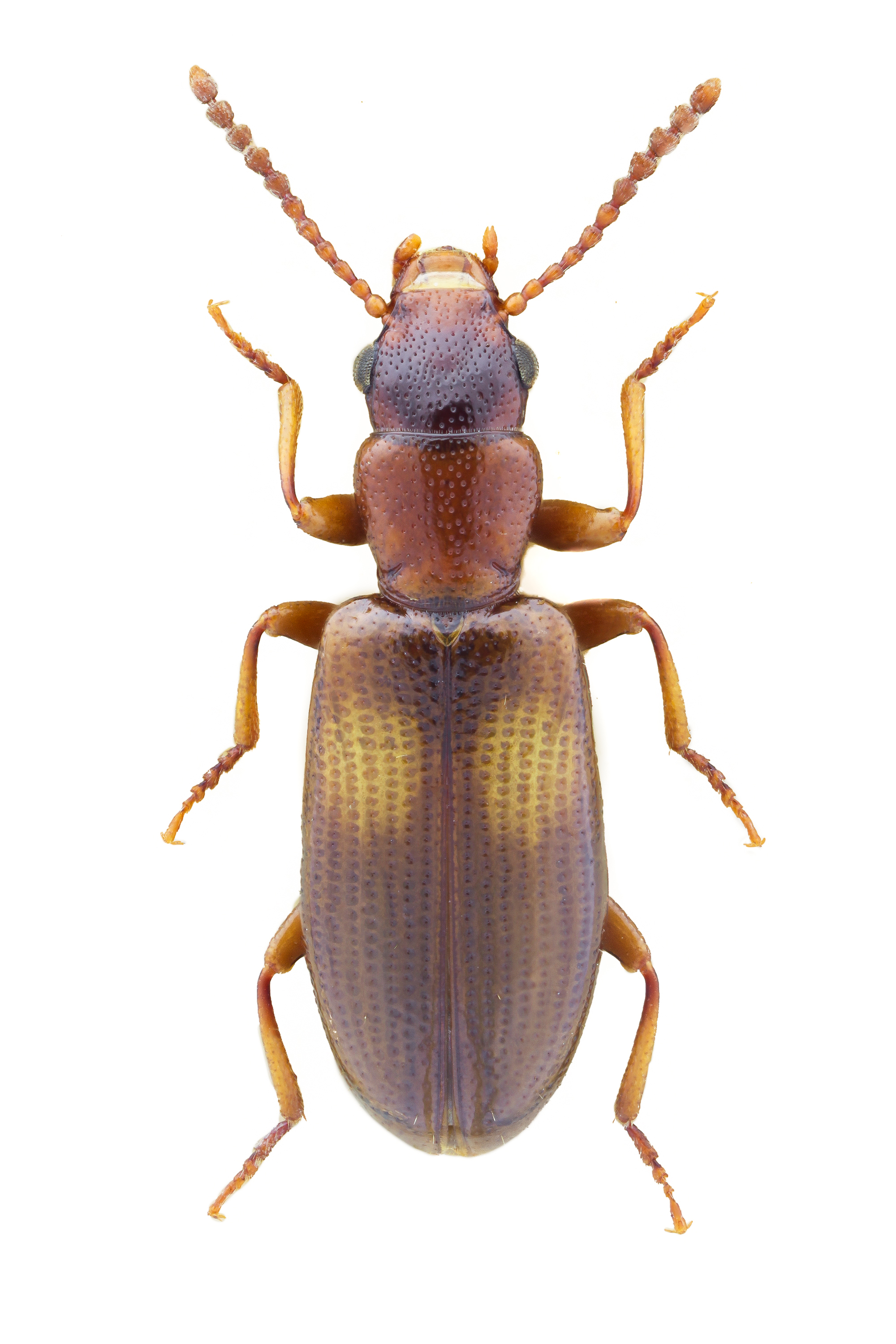
- Sphaeriestes bimaculatus

Scientific classification
- Domain: Eukaryota
- Kingdom: Animalia
- Phylum: Arthropoda
- Class: Insecta
- Order: Coleoptera
- Suborder: Polyphaga
- Infraorder: Cucujiformia
- Family: Salpingidae
- Subfamily: Salpinginae; Leach, 1815

= Salpinginae =

Subfamily of beetles

Salpinginae is a subfamily of narrow-waisted bark beetles in the family Salpingidae.

== Genera ==
- Austrosalpingus Blair, 1925
- Colposis Mulsant, 1859
- Oncosalpingus Blair, 1919
- Platamops Reitter, 1878
- Poophylax Champion, 1916
- Rabocerus Mulsant, 1859
- Rhinosimus Latreille, 1805^{i c g b}
- Salpingoides Nikitsky 1988
- Salpingus Gyllenhal, 1810
- Sphaeriestes Stephens, 1831^{i c g b}
- Trichocolposinus Seidlitz, 1916
- Vincenzellus Reitter, 1911^{i c g b}

Data sources: i = ITIS, c = Catalogue of Life, g = GBIF, b = Bugguide.net
