= Elacatis umbrosus =

Scientific classification
- Domain: Eukaryota
- Kingdom: Animalia
- Phylum: Arthropoda
- Class: Insecta
- Order: Coleoptera
- Suborder: Polyphaga
- Infraorder: Cucujiformia
- Family: Salpingidae
- Genus: Elacatis
- Species: E. umbrosus

Binomial name
- Elacatis umbrosus LeConte, 1861

Species of beetle

Elacatis umbrosus is a species of narrow-waisted bark beetle in the family Salpingidae. It is found in North America.
