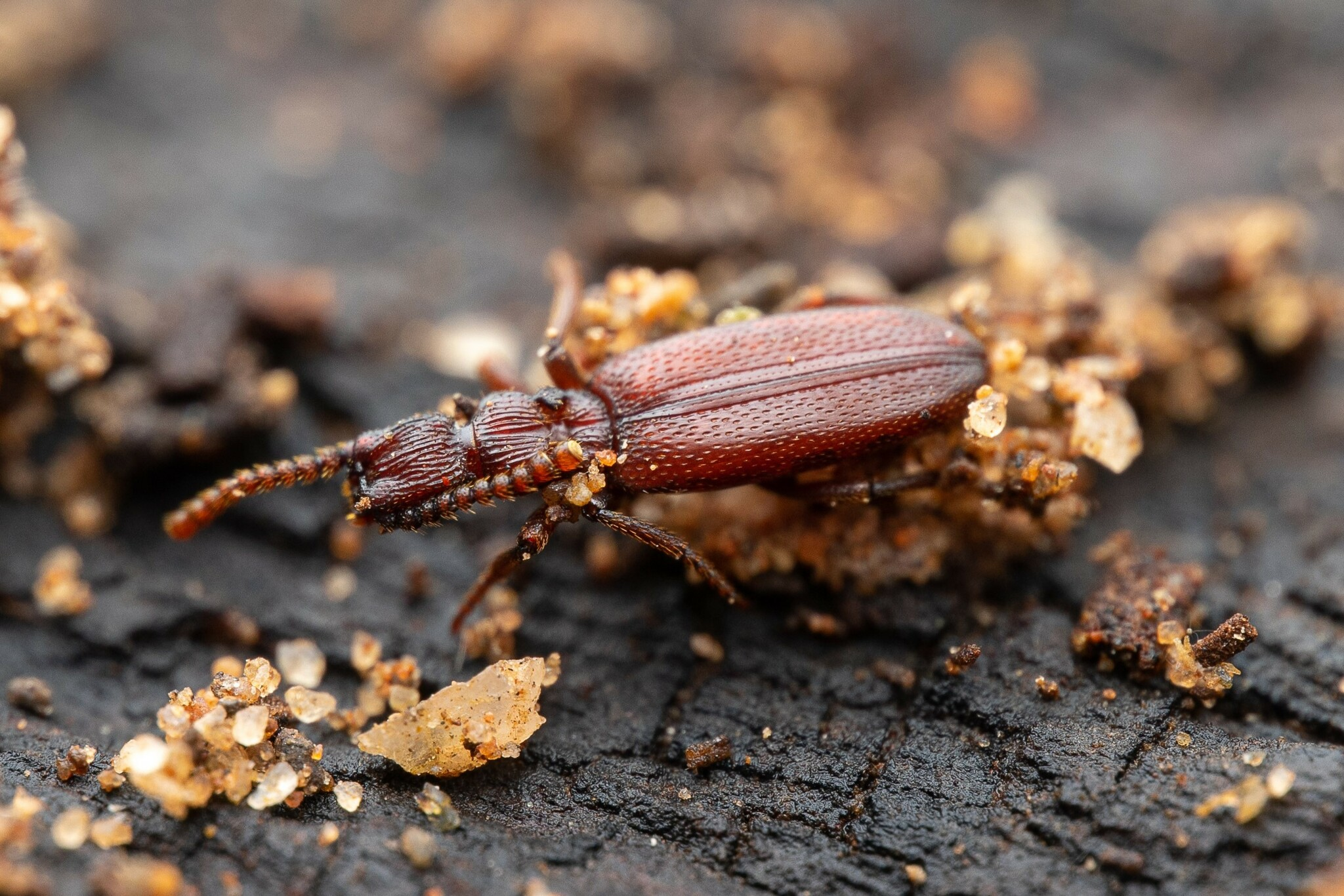

Scientific classification
- Domain: Eukaryota
- Kingdom: Animalia
- Phylum: Arthropoda
- Class: Insecta
- Order: Coleoptera
- Suborder: Polyphaga
- Infraorder: Cucujiformia
- Family: Salpingidae
- Genus: Dacoderus
- Species: D. striaticeps

Binomial name
- Dacoderus striaticeps LeConte, 1858

= Dacoderus striaticeps =

Species of beetle

Dacoderus striaticeps is a species of narrow-waisted bark beetle in the family Salpingidae. It is found in Central America and North America.
