= Vincenzellus elongatus =

Scientific classification
- Domain: Eukaryota
- Kingdom: Animalia
- Phylum: Arthropoda
- Class: Insecta
- Order: Coleoptera
- Suborder: Polyphaga
- Infraorder: Cucujiformia
- Family: Salpingidae
- Genus: Vincenzellus
- Species: V. elongatus

Binomial name
- Vincenzellus elongatus (Mannerheim, 1852)

Species of beetle

Vincenzellus elongatus is a species of narrow-waisted bark beetle in the family Salpingidae. It is found in North America.
