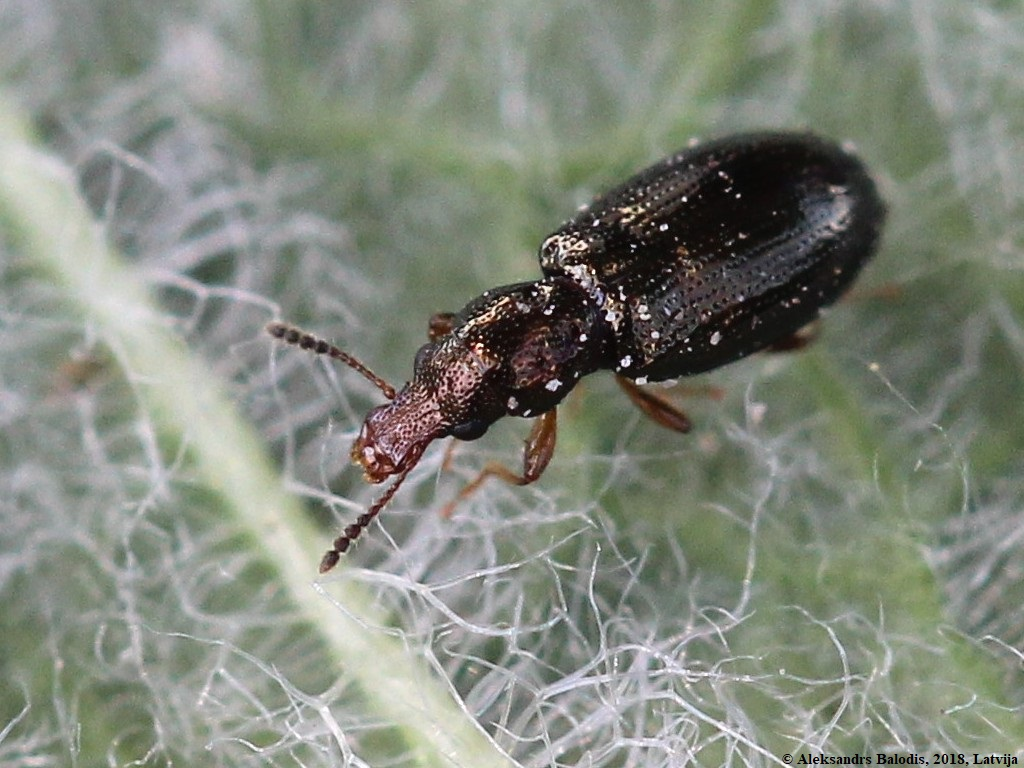

Scientific classification
- Kingdom: Animalia
- Phylum: Arthropoda
- Class: Insecta
- Order: Coleoptera
- Suborder: Polyphaga
- Infraorder: Cucujiformia
- Family: Salpingidae
- Genus: Salpingus
- Species: S. fulvirostris

Binomial name
- Salpingus fulvirostris (Fabricius, 1787)

Synonyms
- Curculio fulvirostris Fabricius, 1787; Curculio planirostris Fabricius, 1787 – invalid primary homonym of Curculio planirostris Piller & Mitterpacher, 1783; Salpingus planirostris (Fabricius, 1787)

= Salpingus fulvirostris =

Species of beetle

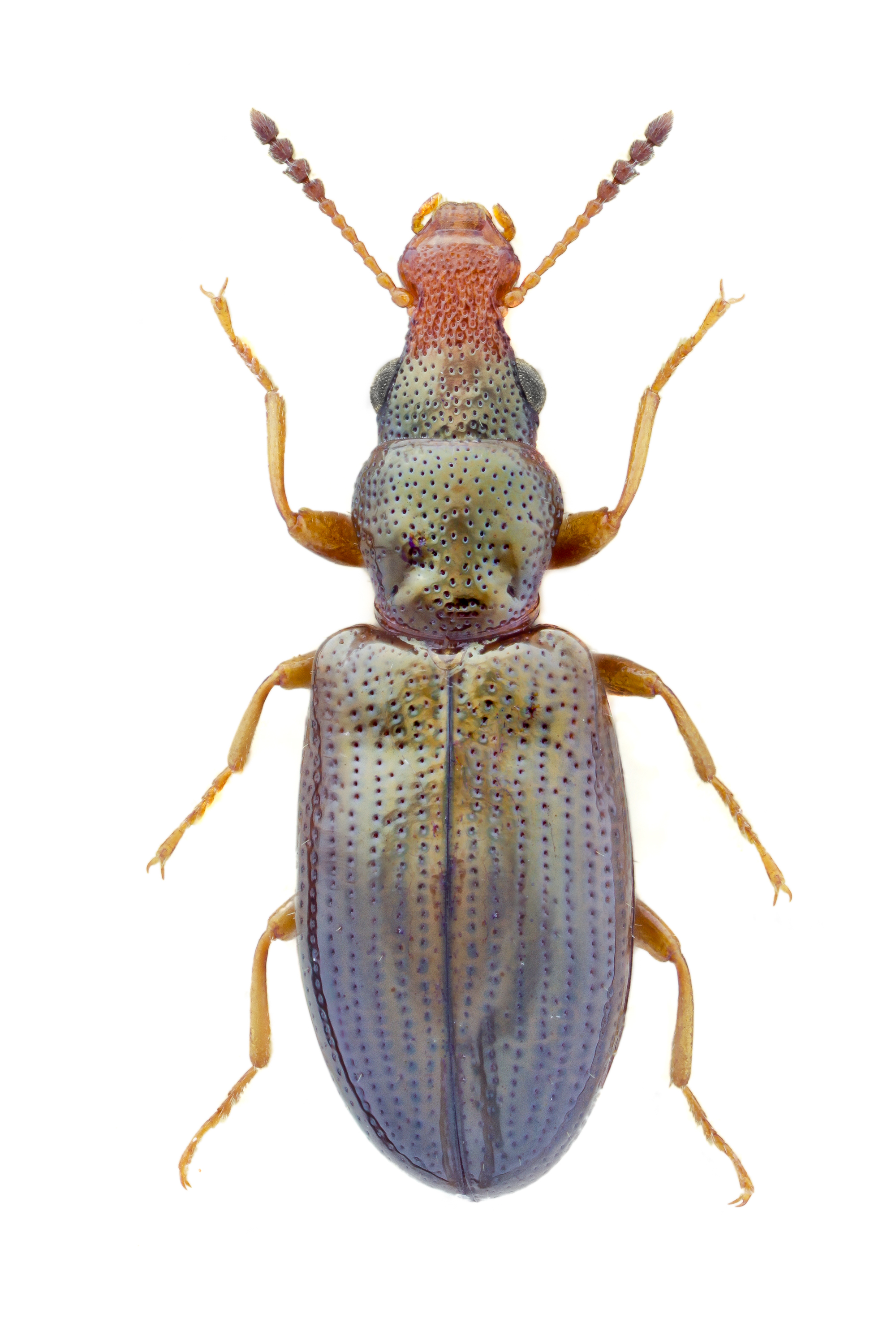

Salpingus fulvirostris is a species of narrow-waisted bark beetle (Salpingidae) native to Europe.

Salpingus fulvirostris measure about 2.5–3.3 mm (0.10–0.13 in) and have metallic dark green elytra.
