= Sphaeriestes virescens =

Scientific classification
- Domain: Eukaryota
- Kingdom: Animalia
- Phylum: Arthropoda
- Class: Insecta
- Order: Coleoptera
- Suborder: Polyphaga
- Infraorder: Cucujiformia
- Family: Salpingidae
- Genus: Sphaeriestes
- Species: S. virescens

Binomial name
- Sphaeriestes virescens LeConte, 1850

Species of beetle

Sphaeriestes virescens is a species of narrow-waisted bark beetle in the family Salpingidae. It is found in North America.
