= Myrmecoderus laevipennis =

Scientific classification
- Domain: Eukaryota
- Kingdom: Animalia
- Phylum: Arthropoda
- Class: Insecta
- Order: Coleoptera
- Suborder: Polyphaga
- Infraorder: Cucujiformia
- Family: Salpingidae
- Genus: Myrmecoderus
- Species: M. laevipennis

Binomial name
- Myrmecoderus laevipennis (Horn, 1893)

Species of beetle

Myrmecoderus laevipennis is a species of narrow-waisted bark beetle in the family Salpingidae.
