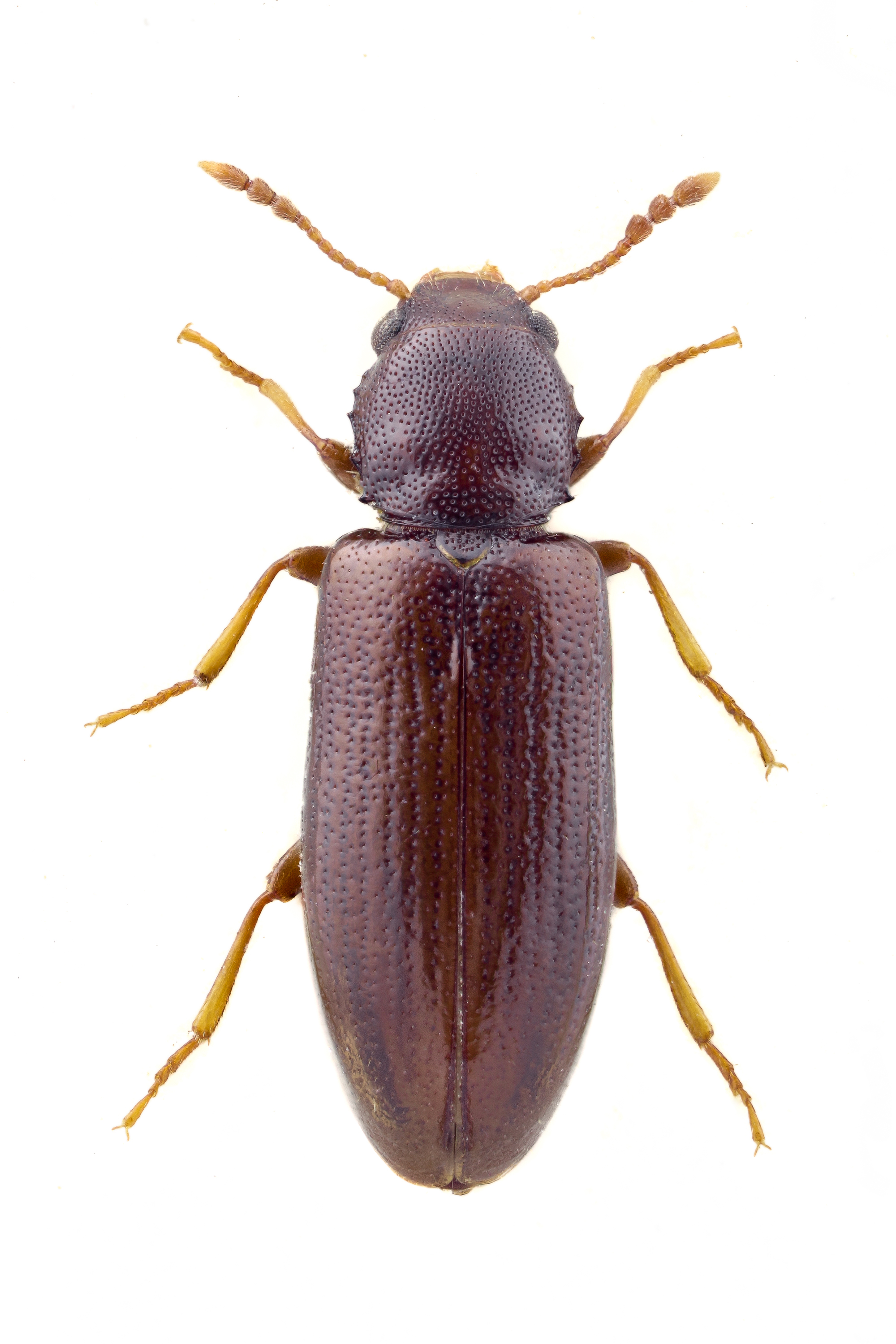

Scientific classification
- Kingdom: Animalia
- Phylum: Arthropoda
- Class: Insecta
- Order: Coleoptera
- Suborder: Polyphaga
- Infraorder: Cucujiformia
- Family: Salpingidae
- Genus: Lissodema
- Species: L. cursor

Binomial name
- Lissodema cursor (Gyllenhal, 1813)

= Lissodema cursor =

Species of beetle

Lissodema cursor is a species of beetle belonging to the family Salpingidae.

It is native to Europe.
