= Rhinosimus viridiaeneus =

Scientific classification
- Domain: Eukaryota
- Kingdom: Animalia
- Phylum: Arthropoda
- Class: Insecta
- Order: Coleoptera
- Suborder: Polyphaga
- Infraorder: Cucujiformia
- Family: Salpingidae
- Genus: Rhinosimus
- Species: R. viridiaeneus

Binomial name
- Rhinosimus viridiaeneus (Randall, 1838)

Species of beetle

Rhinosimus viridiaeneus is a species of narrow-waisted bark beetle in the family Salpingidae. It is found in North America.
