= Dacoderus steineri =

Scientific classification
- Domain: Eukaryota
- Kingdom: Animalia
- Phylum: Arthropoda
- Class: Insecta
- Order: Coleoptera
- Suborder: Polyphaga
- Infraorder: Cucujiformia
- Family: Salpingidae
- Genus: Dacoderus
- Species: D. steineri

Binomial name
- Dacoderus steineri Aalbu, Andrews & Pollock, 2005

Species of beetle

Dacoderus steineri is a species of narrow-waisted bark beetle in the family Salpingidae. It is found in North America.
