= Aegialitis (disambiguation) =

Aegialitis or Aegialites may refer to:

- Aegialitis, a genus of mangrove plants
- Aegialites, a genus of beetles
- Aegialitis Trin., a homonymous plant genus with the replacement name Aegialina
- Charadrius, a genus of birds
