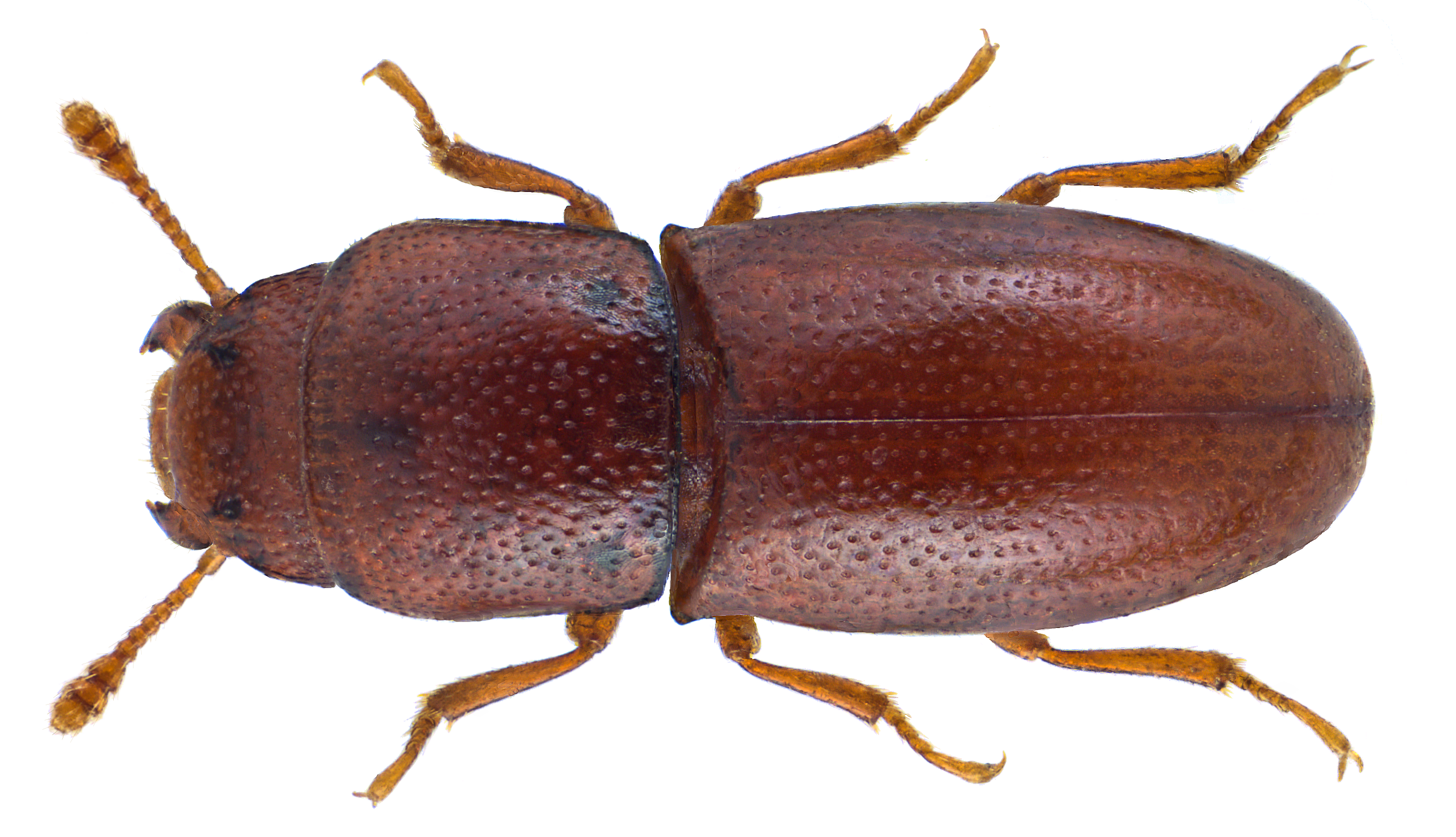
- Aglenus brunneus

Scientific classification
- Domain: Eukaryota
- Kingdom: Animalia
- Phylum: Arthropoda
- Class: Insecta
- Order: Coleoptera
- Suborder: Polyphaga
- Infraorder: Cucujiformia
- Family: Salpingidae
- Genus: Aglenus; Erichson, 1845
- Species: A. brunneus

Binomial name
- Aglenus brunneus (Gyllenhal, 1813)

= Aglenus =

Genus of insects

Aglenus is a genus of narrow-waisted bark beetles in the family Salpingidae. There is at least one described species in Aglenus, A. brunneus.
