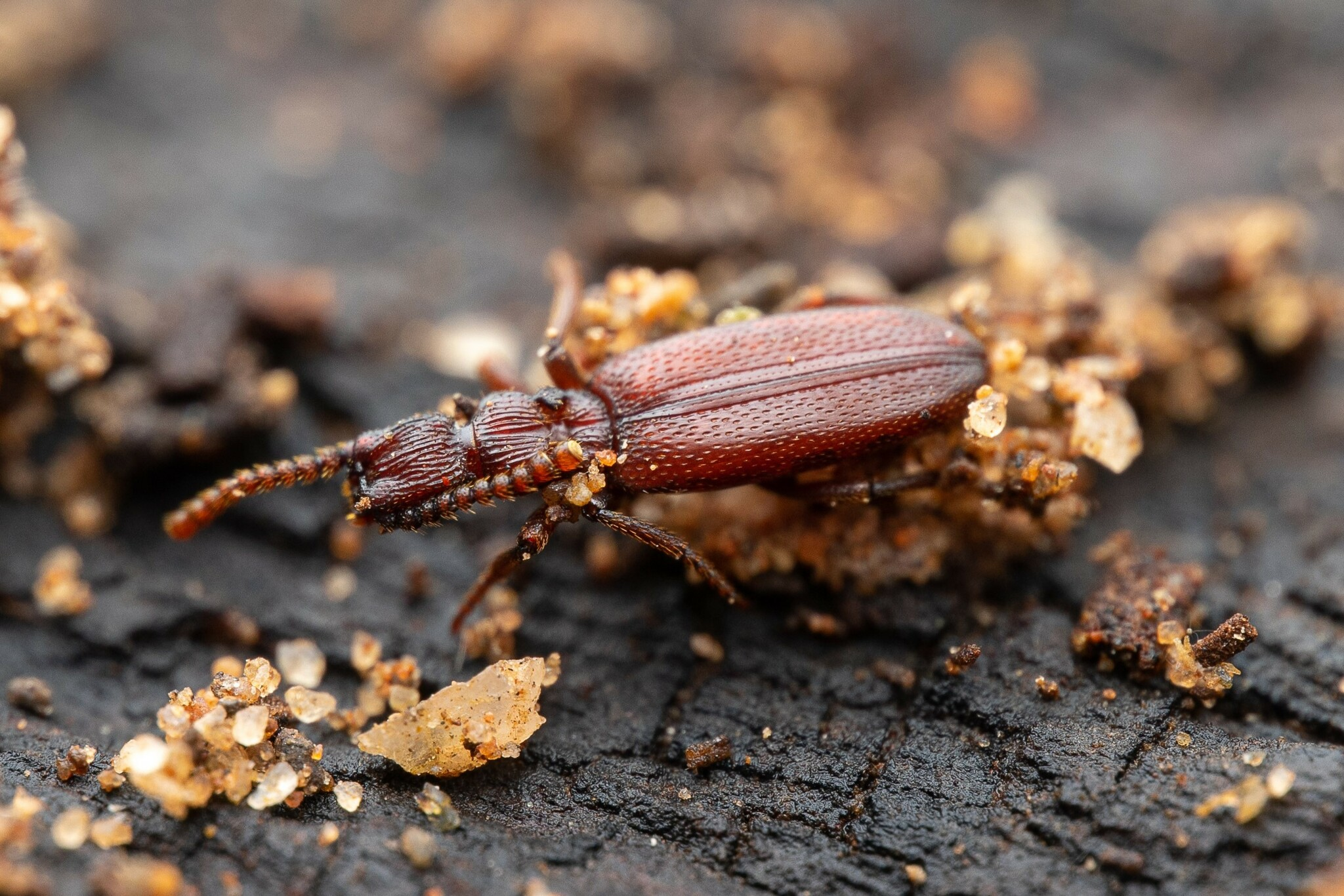
- A Dacoderus striaticeps individual

Scientific classification
- Kingdom: Animalia
- Phylum: Arthropoda
- Class: Insecta
- Order: Coleoptera
- Suborder: Polyphaga
- Infraorder: Cucujiformia
- Family: Salpingidae
- Subfamily: Dacoderinae
- Genus: Dacoderus; LeConte, 1858

= Dacoderus =

Genus of beetles

Dacoderus is a genus of narrow-waisted bark beetles in the family Salpingidae. There are about seven described species in Dacoderus.

== Species ==
These seven species belong to the genus Dacoderus:

- Dacoderus acanthomma Blair, 1918
- Dacoderus laevipennis Horn, 1893
- Dacoderus rossi Aalbu, Andrews & Pollock, 2005
- Dacoderus sleeperi Aalbu, Andrews & Pollock, 2005
- Dacoderus steineri Aalbu, Andrews & Pollock, 2005
- Dacoderus striaticeps LeConte, 1858
- Dacoderus werneri Aalbu, Andrews & Pollock, 2005
