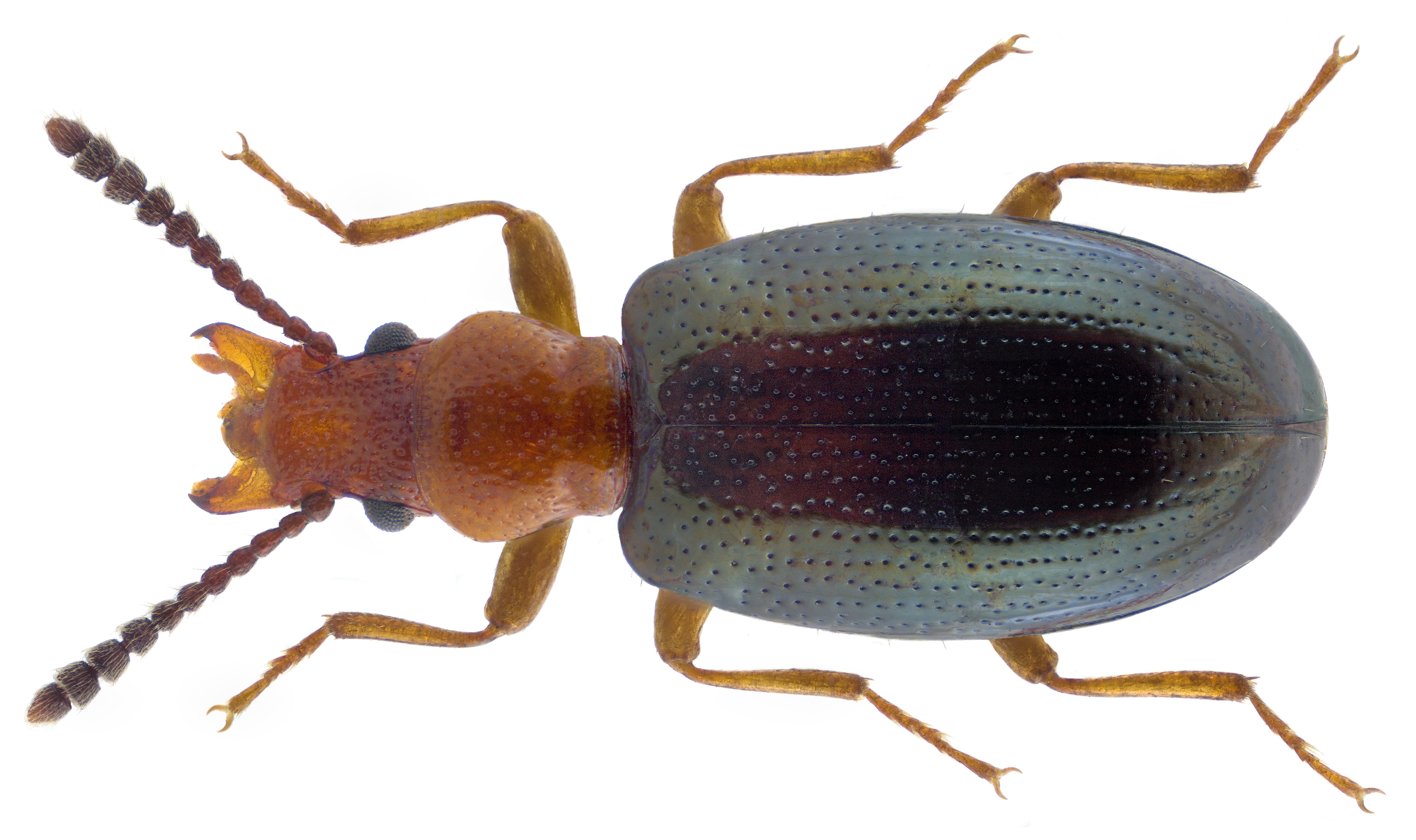
- Vincenzellus ruficollis

Scientific classification
- Kingdom: Animalia
- Phylum: Arthropoda
- Class: Insecta
- Order: Coleoptera
- Suborder: Polyphaga
- Infraorder: Cucujiformia
- Family: Salpingidae
- Subfamily: Salpinginae
- Genus: Vincenzellus; Reitter, 1911

= Vincenzellus =

Genus of beetles

Vincenzellus is a genus of narrow-waisted bark beetles in the family Salpingidae. There are at least two described species in Vincenzellus.

Vincenzellus ruficollis

== Species ==
These two species belong to the genus Vincenzellus:

- Vincenzellus elongatus (Mannerheim, 1852)
- Vincenzellus ruficollis (Panzer, 1794)
