= Aegialites californicus =

Scientific classification
- Kingdom: Animalia
- Phylum: Arthropoda
- Clade: Pancrustacea
- Class: Insecta
- Order: Coleoptera
- Suborder: Polyphaga
- Infraorder: Cucujiformia
- Family: Salpingidae
- Genus: Aegialites
- Species: A. californicus

Binomial name
- Aegialites californicus (Motschulsky, 1845)

Species of beetle

Aegialites californicus is a species of narrow-waisted bark beetle in the family Salpingidae. It is found in North America.
