= Myrmecoderus =

Scientific classification
- Domain: Eukaryota
- Kingdom: Animalia
- Phylum: Arthropoda
- Class: Insecta
- Order: Coleoptera
- Suborder: Polyphaga
- Infraorder: Cucujiformia
- Family: Salpingidae
- Subfamily: Dacoderinae
- Genus: Myrmecoderus; Aalbu, Andrews & Pollock, 2005

Genus of beetles

Myrmecoderus is a genus of narrow-waisted bark beetles in the family Salpingidae. There are at least three described species in Myrmecoderus.

== Species ==
These three species belong to the genus Myrmecoderus:

- Myrmecoderus dominicensis (Horn, 1876)
- Myrmecoderus laevipennis (Horn, 1893)
- Myrmecoderus rileyi Aalbu, Andrews & Pollock, 2005
