= Rhinosimus =

- Rhinosimus sp.

Scientific classification
- Kingdom: Animalia
- Phylum: Arthropoda
- Class: Insecta
- Order: Coleoptera
- Suborder: Polyphaga
- Infraorder: Cucujiformia
- Family: Salpingidae
- Subfamily: Salpinginae
- Genus: Rhinosimus

Species
- Rhinosimus viridiaeneus Rhinosimus planirostris Rhinosimus ruficollis

Genus of beetles

Rhinosimus is a genus of narrow-waisted bark beetles, usually recognized by the long rostrum on the head of an adult beetle.
