= Lissodema =

Scientific classification
- Domain: Eukaryota
- Kingdom: Animalia
- Phylum: Arthropoda
- Class: Insecta
- Order: Coleoptera
- Suborder: Polyphaga
- Infraorder: Cucujiformia
- Family: Salpingidae
- Genus: Lissodema; Curtis, 1833

Genus of beetles

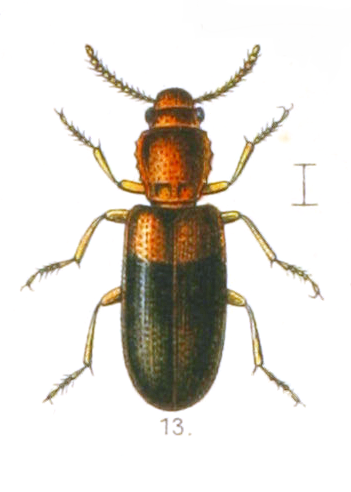
Lissodema denticolle

Lissodema is a genus of beetles belonging to the family Salpingidae.

Species:

- Lissodema cursor
- Lissodema denticolle
- Lissodema lituratum
