= Aegialites subopacus =

Scientific classification
- Kingdom: Animalia
- Phylum: Arthropoda
- Clade: Pancrustacea
- Class: Insecta
- Order: Coleoptera
- Suborder: Polyphaga
- Infraorder: Cucujiformia
- Family: Salpingidae
- Genus: Aegialites
- Species: A. subopacus

Binomial name
- Aegialites subopacus (Van Dyke, 1918)

Synonyms
- Eurystethes subopacus Van Dyke, 1918

Species of beetle

Aegialites subopacus is a species of narrow-waisted bark beetle in the family Salpingidae. It is found in North America.
