= Elacatis =

Scientific classification
- Domain: Eukaryota
- Kingdom: Animalia
- Phylum: Arthropoda
- Class: Insecta
- Order: Coleoptera
- Suborder: Polyphaga
- Infraorder: Cucujiformia
- Family: Salpingidae
- Genus: Elacatis; Pascoe, 1860

Genus of beetles

Elacatis is a genus of false tiger beetles in the family Salpingidae. There are about 13 described species in Elacatis.

== Species ==
These 13 species belong to the genus Elacatis:

- Elacatis artichorax (Pic, 1875)
- Elacatis bakeri Chapin
- Elacatis californicus (Mannerheim, 1843)
- Elacatis delusa
- Elacatis fasciatus (Bland, 1864)
- Elacatis formosanus (Borchmann, 1916)
- Elacatis longicornis Horn, 1871
- Elacatis lugubris (Horn, 1868)
- Elacatis rugicollis (Borchmann, 1916)
- Elacatis senecionis (Champion, 1888)
- Elacatis similis (Borchmann, 1916)
- Elacatis umbrosus LeConte, 1861
- Elacatis undulata Chapin
