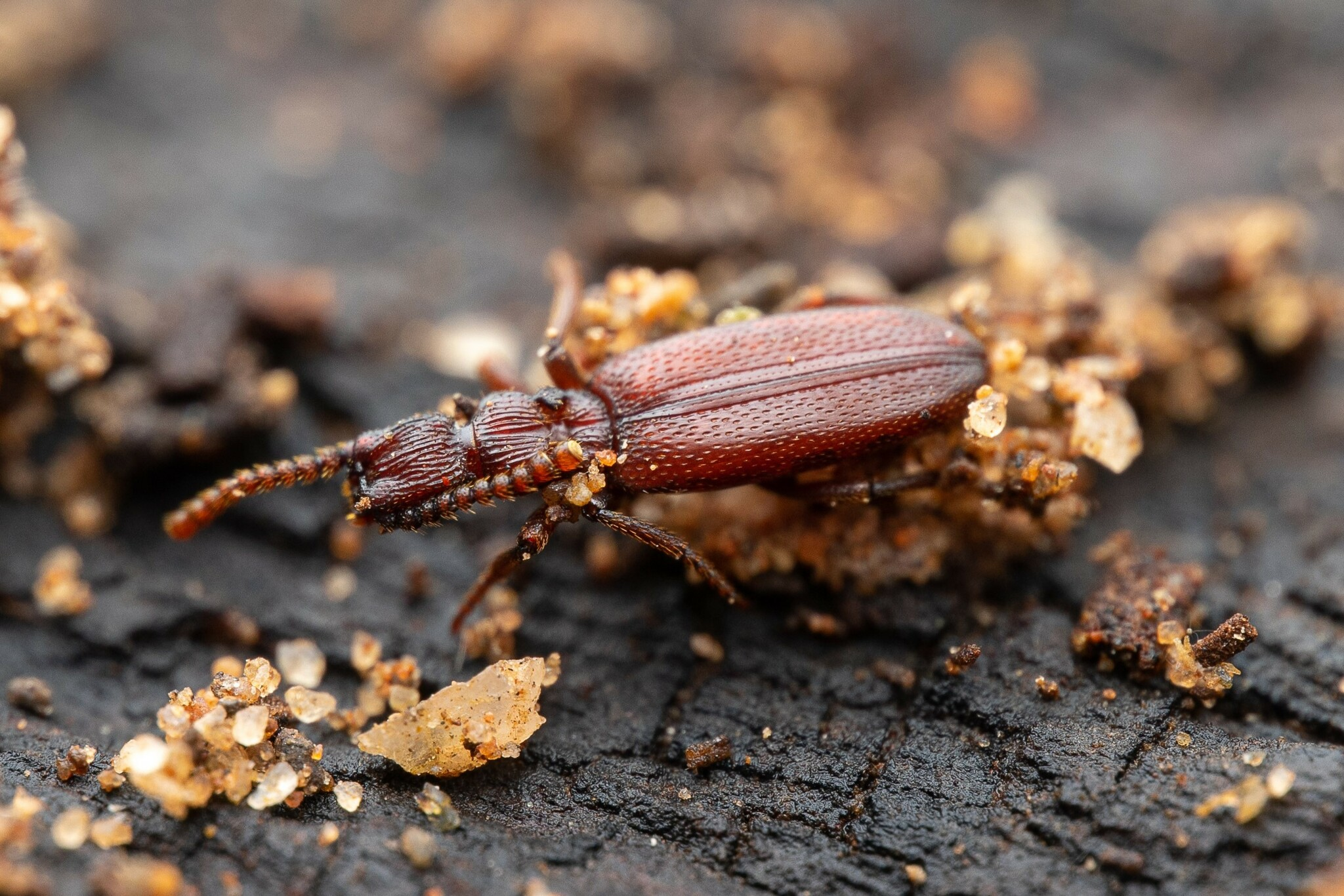
- Dacoderus striaticeps

Scientific classification
- Kingdom: Animalia
- Phylum: Arthropoda
- Class: Insecta
- Order: Coleoptera
- Suborder: Polyphaga
- Infraorder: Cucujiformia
- Family: Salpingidae
- Subfamily: Dacoderinae; LeConte, 1862

= Dacoderinae =

Subfamily of beetles

Dacoderinae is a subfamily of narrow-waisted bark beetles in the family Salpingidae. There are at least 3 genera and about 11 described species in Dacoderinae.

== Genera ==
These three genera belong to the subfamily Dacoderinae:

- Dacoderus LeConte, 1858
- Myrmecoderus Aalbu, Andrews & Pollock, 2005
- Tretothorax Lea, 1911
