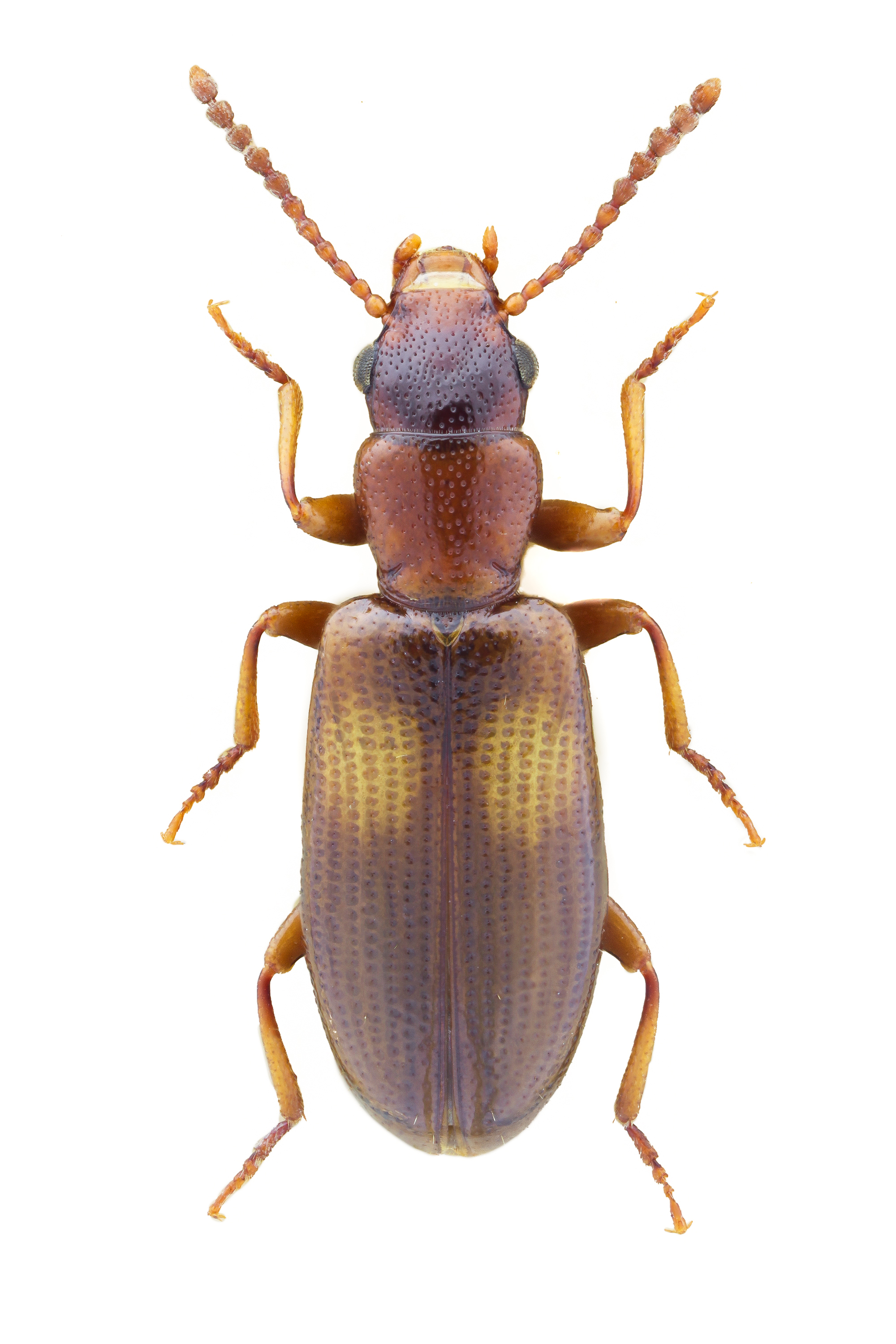
- Sphaeriestes bimaculatus

Scientific classification
- Domain: Eukaryota
- Kingdom: Animalia
- Phylum: Arthropoda
- Class: Insecta
- Order: Coleoptera
- Suborder: Polyphaga
- Infraorder: Cucujiformia
- Family: Salpingidae
- Subfamily: Salpinginae
- Genus: Sphaeriestes; Stephens, 1831

= Sphaeriestes =

Genus of beetles

Sphaeriestes is a genus of narrow-waisted bark beetles in the family Salpingidae. There are about 13 described species in Sphaeriestes.

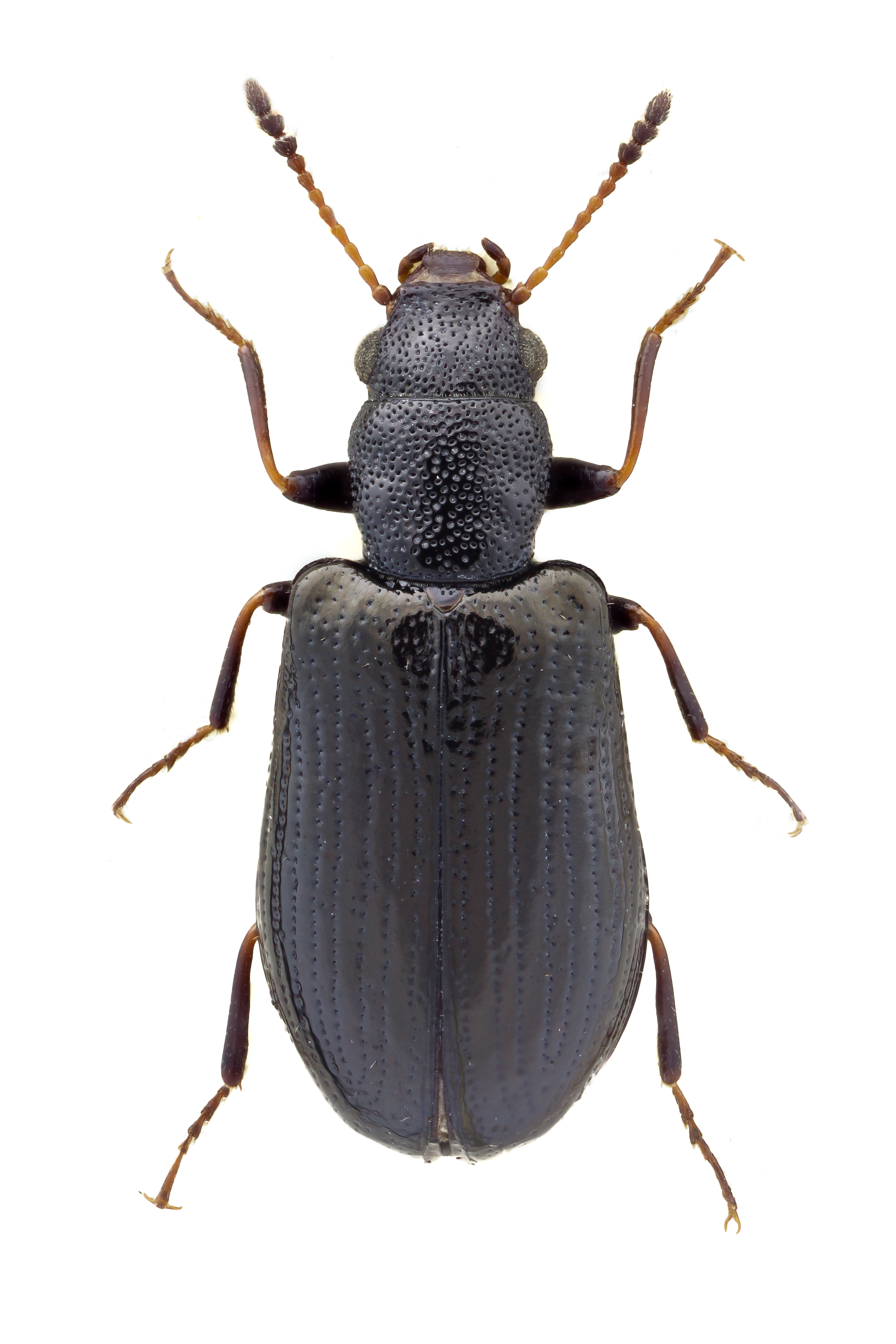
Sphaeriestes stockmanni

== Species ==
These 13 species belong to the genus Sphaeriestes:

- Sphaeriestes aeratus (Mulsant, 1859)
- Sphaeriestes alternatus (LeConte, 1859)
- Sphaeriestes bimaculatus (Gyllenhal, 1810)
- Sphaeriestes borbonicus Seidlitz, 1886
- Sphaeriestes castaneus (Panzer, 1796)
- Sphaeriestes cribarius (Fairmaire, 1898)
- Sphaeriestes exsanguis (Abeille de Perrin, 1870)
- Sphaeriestes impressus (Wollaton, 1857)
- Sphaeriestes reyi (Abeille de Perrin, 1874)
- Sphaeriestes sculptilis Fairmaire, 1868
- Sphaeriestes stockmanni (Biström, 1977)
- Sphaeriestes tibialis (LeConte, 1866)
- Sphaeriestes virescens LeConte, 1850
