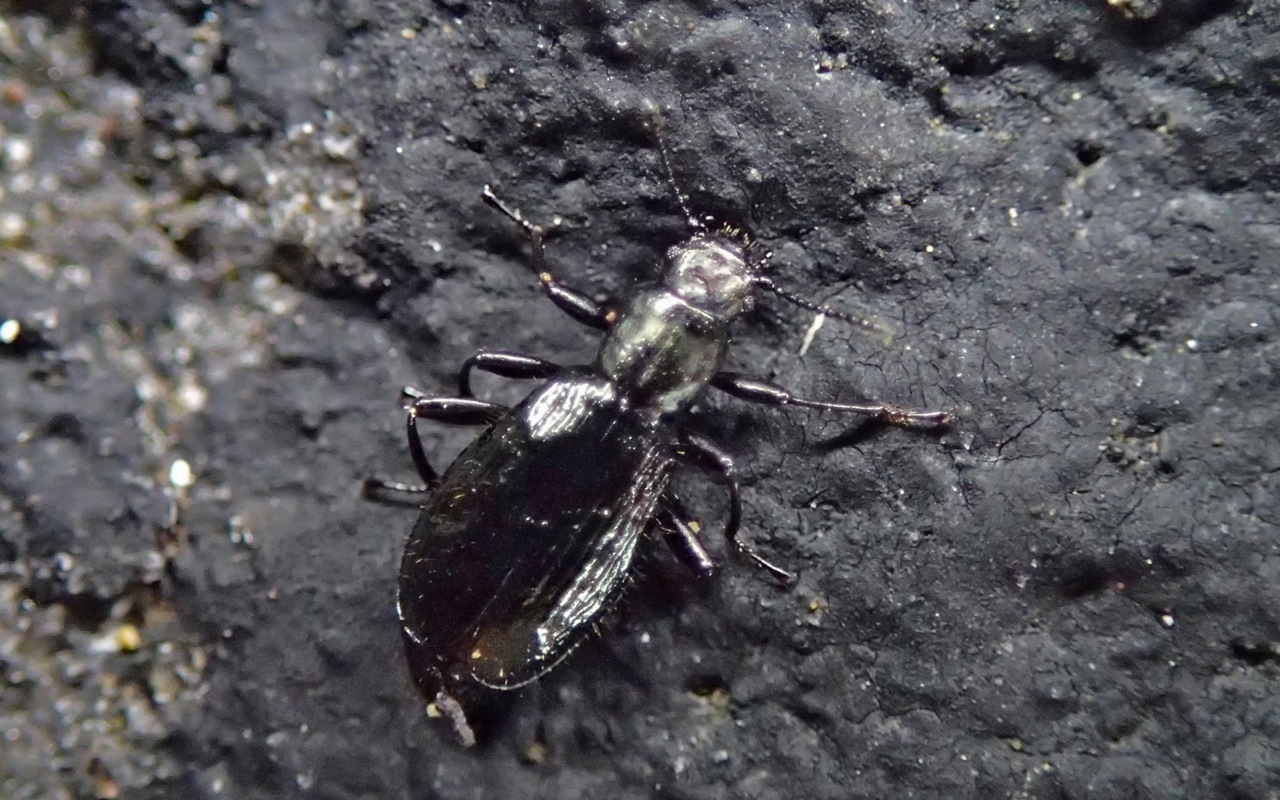

Scientific classification
- Kingdom: Animalia
- Phylum: Arthropoda
- Clade: Pancrustacea
- Class: Insecta
- Order: Coleoptera
- Suborder: Polyphaga
- Infraorder: Cucujiformia
- Family: Salpingidae
- Subfamily: Aegialitinae
- Genus: Aegialites; Mannerheim, 1853

Synonyms
- Eurystethes Seidlitz, 1916

= Aegialites =

Genus of beetles

Aegialites is a genus of narrow-waisted bark beetles in the family Salpingidae. There are about 13 described species in Aegialites.

== Species ==
These 13 species belong to the genus Aegialites.

- Aegialites alaskaensis Zerche, 2004
- Aegialites californicus (Motschulsky, 1845)
- Aegialites canadensis Zerche, 2004
- Aegialites charlottae Zerche, 2004
- Aegialites debilis Mannerheim, 1853
- Aegialites farallonensis Zerche, 2004
- Aegialites fuchsii Horn, 1893
- Aegialites latus Zerche, 2004
- Aegialites longicornis Zerche, 2004
- Aegialites marinensis Zerche, 2004
- Aegialites saintgeorgensis Zerche, 2004
- Aegialites saintpaulensis Zerche, 2004
- Aegialites subopacus (Van Dyke, 1918)
