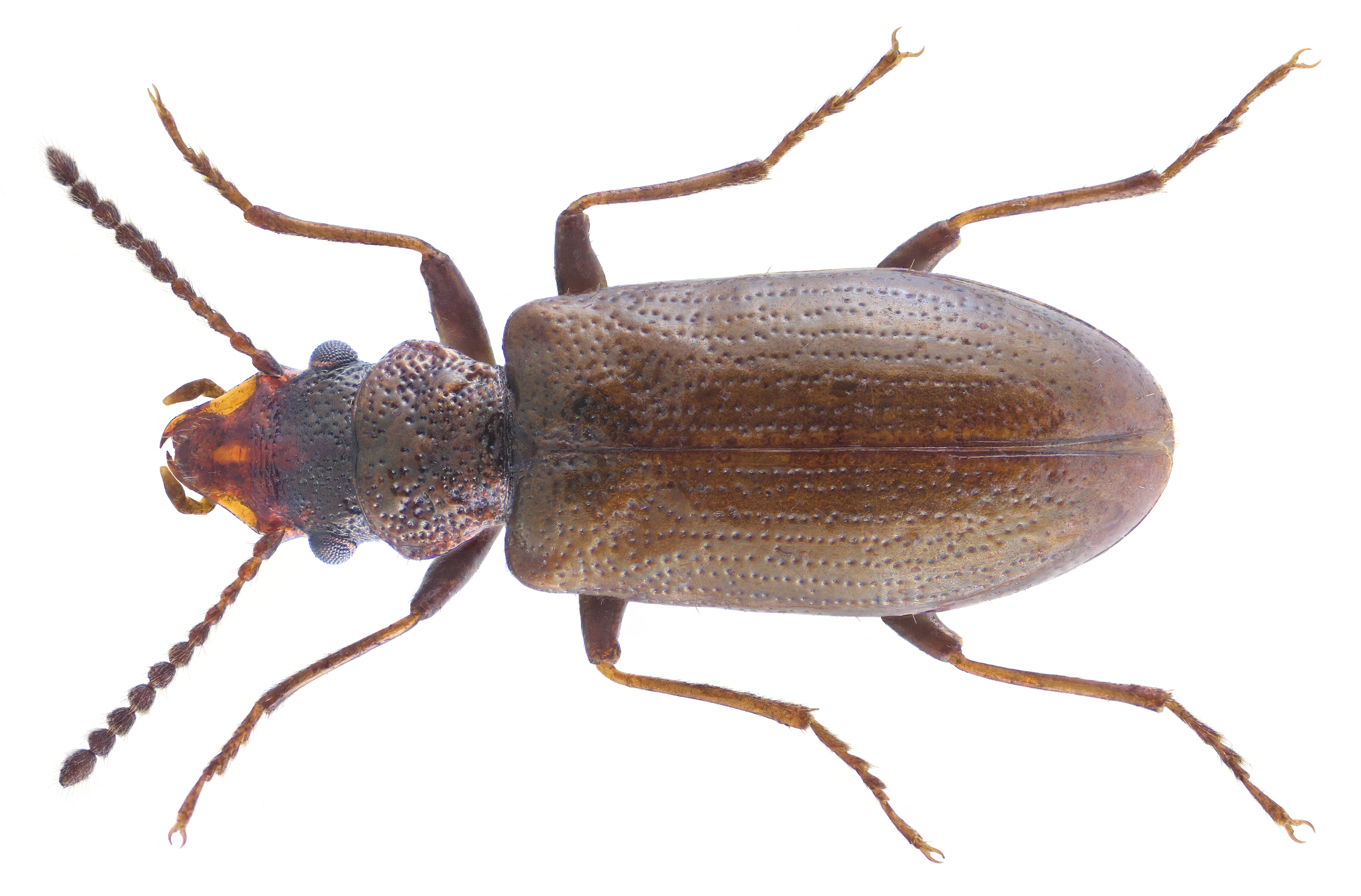
- Rabocerus gabrieli

Scientific classification
- Kingdom: Animalia
- Phylum: Arthropoda
- Clade: Pancrustacea
- Class: Insecta
- Order: Coleoptera
- Suborder: Polyphaga
- Infraorder: Cucujiformia
- Family: Salpingidae
- Genus: Rabocerus; Mulsant, 1859

= Rabocerus =

Genus of beetles

Rabocerus is a genus of beetles belonging to the family Salpingidae.

The species of this genus are found in Europe.

Species:

- Rabocerus foveolatus (Ljungh, 1823)
- Rabocerus gabrieli (Gerhardt, 1901)
