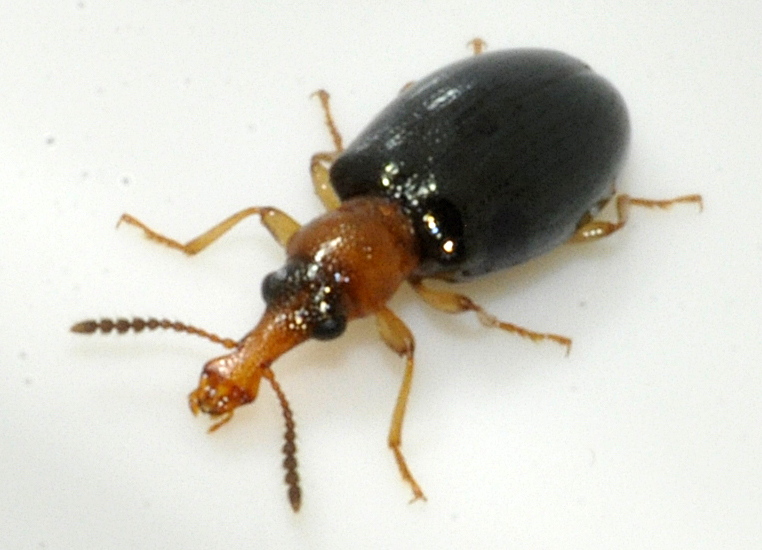
- Salpingus ruficollis

Scientific classification
- Domain: Eukaryota
- Kingdom: Animalia
- Phylum: Arthropoda
- Class: Insecta
- Order: Coleoptera
- Suborder: Polyphaga
- Infraorder: Cucujiformia
- Family: Salpingidae
- Genus: Salpingus; Illiger, 1801

= Salpingus =

Genus of beetles

Salpingus is a genus of beetles belonging to the family Salpingidae.

The species of this genus are found in Europe.

== Species ==
The following species are recognised in the genus Salpingus:

- Salpingus fauveli Blair, 1928
- Salpingus fulvirostris (Fabricius, 1787)
- Salpingus henricusmontemini Alekseev, 2013
- Salpingus hirtus Broun, 1883
- Salpingus lepidulus Broun, 1910
- Salpingus quisquilius Broun, 1883
- Salpingus rucamanque Solervicens, 2020
- Salpingus ruficollis (Linnaeus, 1761)
- Salpingus simplex Broun, 1883
- Salpingus taiwanus Masumoto, Hirano & Akita, 2016
- Salpingus tapirus (Abeille de Perrin, 1874)
