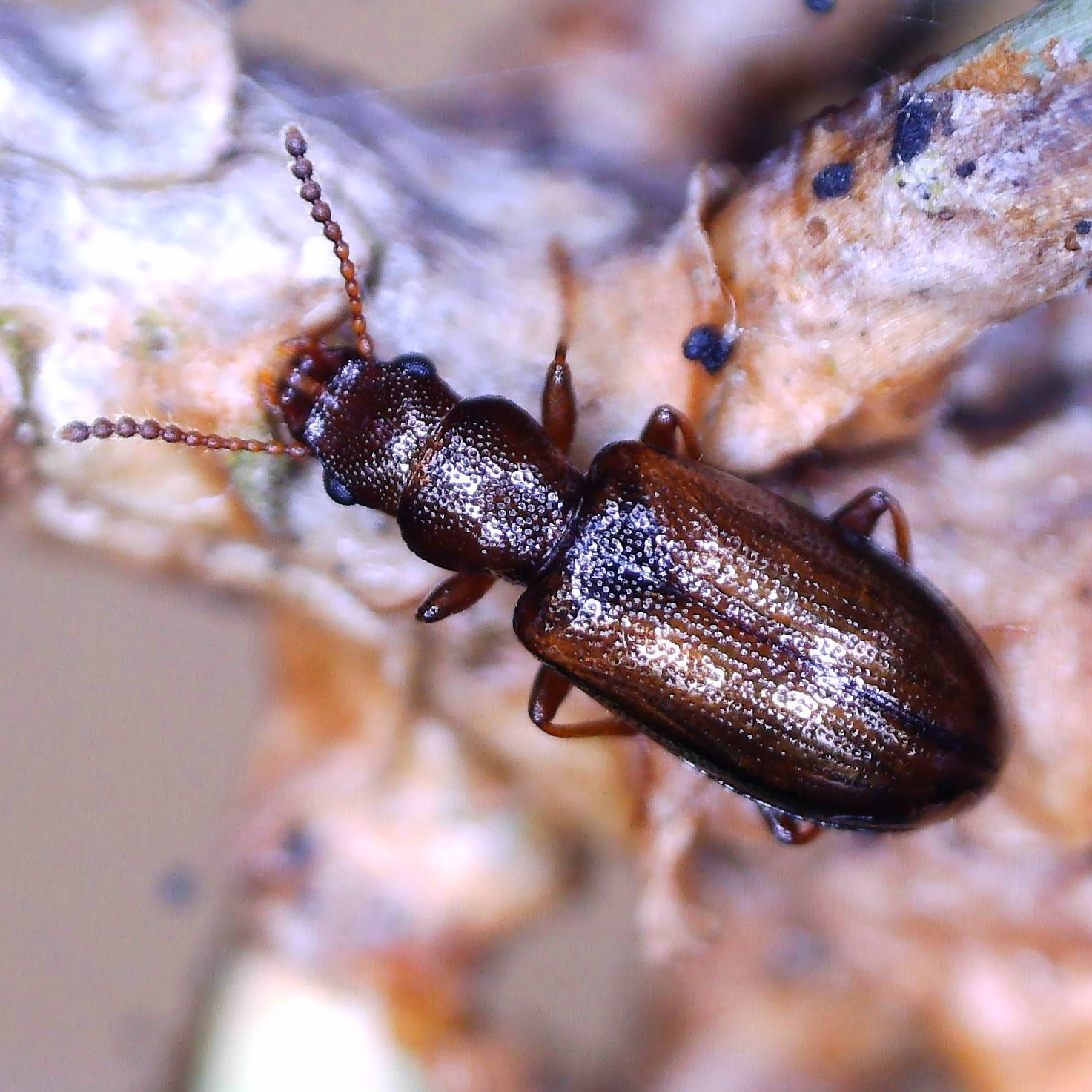
- Sphaeriestes castaneus

Scientific classification
- Kingdom: Animalia
- Phylum: Arthropoda
- Clade: Pancrustacea
- Class: Insecta
- Order: Coleoptera
- Suborder: Polyphaga
- Infraorder: Cucujiformia
- Superfamily: Tenebrionoidea
- Family: Salpingidae; Leach, 1815

Subfamilies
- Aegialitinae LeConte, 1862; Agleninae Horn, 1878; Dacoderinae LeConte, 1862; Inopeplinae Grouvelle, 1908; Othniinae LeConte, 1861; Prostominiinae Grouvelle, 1914; Salpinginae Leach, 1815

= Salpingidae =

Salpingidae Temporal range: Albian–Recent

Family of beetles

Salpingidae or narrow-waisted bark beetles is a family of beetles in the superfamily Tenebrionoidea. The species are small, about 1.5 – 7 mm in length. The family is globally distributed and consists of about 45 genera and 300 species, which are generally found in the temperate regions of both hemispheres. The family is mainly associated with plants (both living and dead) as well as with ascomycete and hyphomycete fungi. Some members of the family are associated with unusual habitats, like Aegialites and Antarcticodomus, which are found in coastal areas including the intertidal zone, with former feeding on algae.

== Genera ==
These 28 genera belong to the family Salpingidae:

- Aegialites Mannerheim, 1853
- Aglenus Erichson, 1845
- Antarcticodomus Brookes, 1951
- Aprostomis Grouvelle, 1913
- Cariderus Mulsant, 1859
- Colposis Mulsant, 1859
- Dacoderus LeConte, 1858
- Elacatis Pascoe, 1860 (false tiger beetles)
- Episcapha Dejean, 1833
- Inopeplus Smith, 1851
- Istrisia Lewis, 1895
- Lissodema Curtis, 1833
- Myrmecoderus Aalbu, Andrews & Pollock, 2005
- Ocholissa Pascoe, 1863
- Parelacatis Chapin, 1923
- Poophylax Champion, 1916
- Rabocerus Mulsant, 1859
- Rhinosimus Latreille, 1805
- Salpingus Illiger, 1801
- Serrotibia Reitter, 1877
- Sosthenes Champion, 1889
- Sphaeriestes Stephens, 1831
- Szekessya Kaszab, 1955
- Tretothorax Lea, 1911-01
- Trogocryptoides Champion, 1924
- Vincenzellus Reitter, 1911
- † Cretoprostominia Jiang, Liu & Chen, 2024 Burmese amber, Albian-Cenomanian
- † Eopeplus Kirejtshuk & Nel, 2009 Oise amber, France, Ypresian
- † Protolissodema Alekseev, 2013 Baltic amber, Eocene
