= Emmesa labiata =

Scientific classification
- Domain: Eukaryota
- Kingdom: Animalia
- Phylum: Arthropoda
- Class: Insecta
- Order: Coleoptera
- Suborder: Polyphaga
- Infraorder: Cucujiformia
- Family: Melandryidae
- Genus: Emmesa
- Species: E. labiata

Binomial name
- Emmesa labiata (Say, 1824)

Species of beetle

Emmesa labiata is a species of false darkling beetle in the family Melandryidae. It is found in North America.
