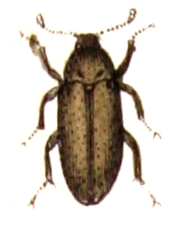
- Orchesia

Scientific classification
- Domain: Eukaryota
- Kingdom: Animalia
- Phylum: Arthropoda
- Class: Insecta
- Order: Coleoptera
- Suborder: Polyphaga
- Infraorder: Cucujiformia
- Family: Melandryidae
- Subfamily: Melandryinae
- Tribe: Orchesiini; Mulsant, 1856

= Orchesiini =

Tribe of beetles

Orchesiini is a tribe of false darkling beetles in the family Melandryidae. There are at least three genera and about seven described species in Orchesiini.

== Genera ==
These three genera belong to the tribe Orchesiini:

- Lederia Reitter, 1880^{g b}
- Microscapha LeConte, 1866^{g b}
- Orchesia Latreille, 1807^{g b}

Data sources: i = ITIS, c = Catalogue of Life, g = GBIF, b = Bugguide.net
