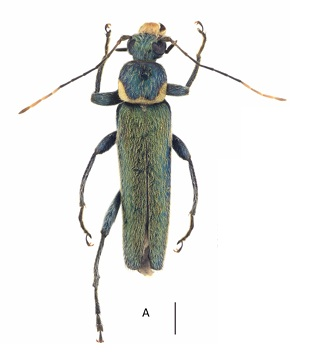

Scientific classification
- Domain: Eukaryota
- Kingdom: Animalia
- Phylum: Arthropoda
- Class: Insecta
- Order: Coleoptera
- Suborder: Polyphaga
- Infraorder: Cucujiformia
- Family: Melandryidae
- Genus: Osphya
- Species: O. flavomarginata

Binomial name
- Osphya flavomarginata Shi, 2025

= Osphya flavomarginata =

Species of beetle

Osphya flavomarginata is a species of beetle of the Melandryidae family. This species is only known from the type locality Tiechang Village in Yunlong County in China.

Adults reach a length of about 7.7 mm. The antennae are bicolored, with the apical four segments yellow. The pronotum is basally yellow and there is a yellow region along the posterior margin and the basal half of the lateral margins. The elytra are metallic green with golden recumbent setae.

== Etymology ==
The name of the species is derived from Latin flav- (meaning yellow) and margin- (meaning margin) and refers to the distinctive narrow yellow margin on the base of the pronotum.
