= Prothalpia holmbergi =

Scientific classification
- Domain: Eukaryota
- Kingdom: Animalia
- Phylum: Arthropoda
- Class: Insecta
- Order: Coleoptera
- Suborder: Polyphaga
- Infraorder: Cucujiformia
- Family: Melandryidae
- Tribe: Melandryini
- Genus: Prothalpia
- Species: P. holmbergi

Binomial name
- Prothalpia holmbergi (Mannerheim, 1852)

Species of beetle

Prothalpia holmbergi is a species of false darkling beetle in the family Melandryidae. It is found in North America.
