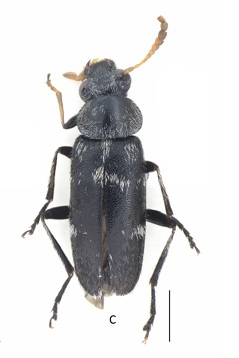

Scientific classification
- Domain: Eukaryota
- Kingdom: Animalia
- Phylum: Arthropoda
- Class: Insecta
- Order: Coleoptera
- Suborder: Polyphaga
- Infraorder: Cucujiformia
- Family: Melandryidae
- Genus: Osphya
- Species: O. clavata

Binomial name
- Osphya clavata Shi, 2025

= Osphya clavata =

Species of beetle

Osphya clavata is a species of beetle of the Melandryidae family. This species is only known from the type locality Xima in Yingjiang County in China.

Adults reach a length of about 4.7 mm. The dorsum is black without metallic hue and elytra have thickened recumbent setae forming a whitish pattern. The antennae, mouthparts, protibiae, and tarsi are all yellow.

== Etymology ==
The name of the species is derived from Latin clav- (meaning claviform) and refers to the unique claviform antennae of the species.
