= Clinocera =

Clinocera may refer to:

- Clinocera (fly), a genus of flies in the family Empididae
- Clinocera Reitter, 1906, a genus of beetles in the family Tetratomidae, synonym of Orchesia
- Clinocera Deyrolle, 1864, a genus of beetles in the family Buprestidae, synonym of Paragrilus
