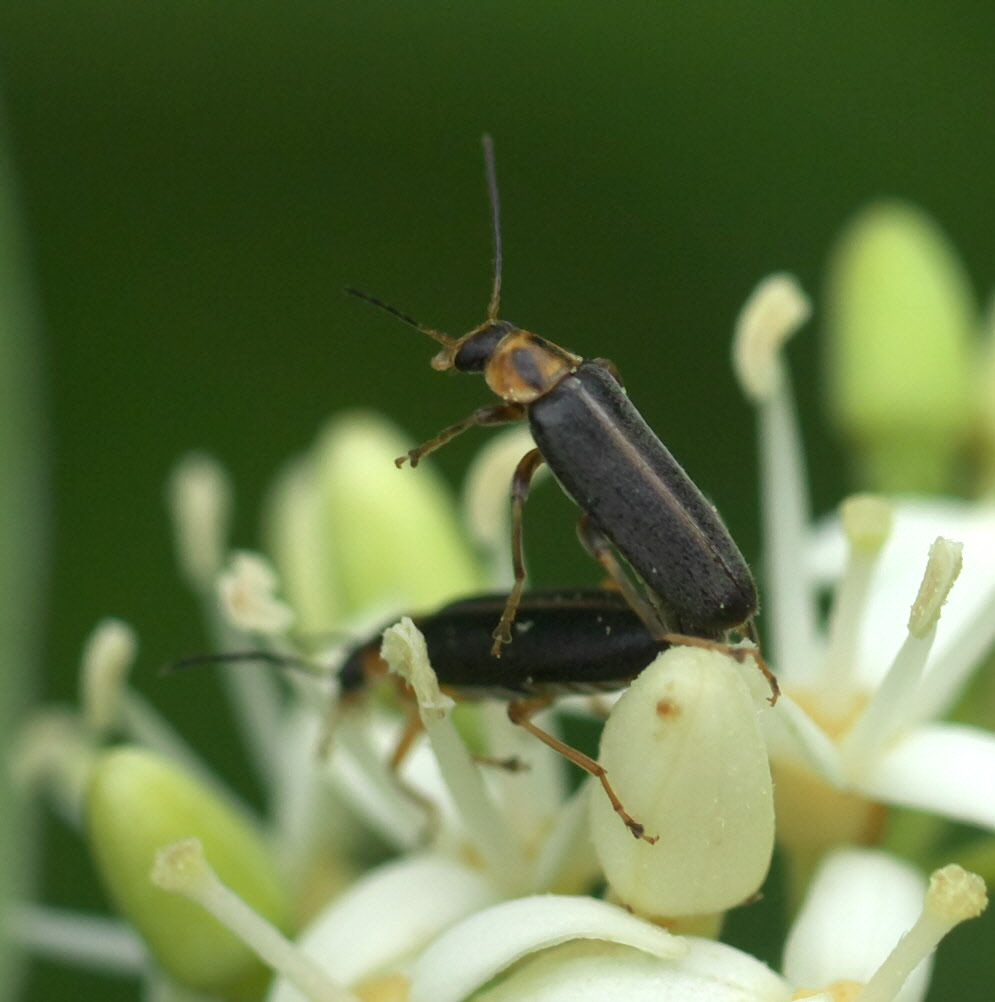

Scientific classification
- Kingdom: Animalia
- Phylum: Arthropoda
- Clade: Pancrustacea
- Class: Insecta
- Order: Coleoptera
- Suborder: Polyphaga
- Infraorder: Cucujiformia
- Family: Melandryidae
- Genus: Osphya
- Species: O. varians

Binomial name
- Osphya varians (LeConte, 1866)

= Osphya varians =

Species of beetle

Osphya varians is a species of false darkling beetle in the family Melandryidae.
