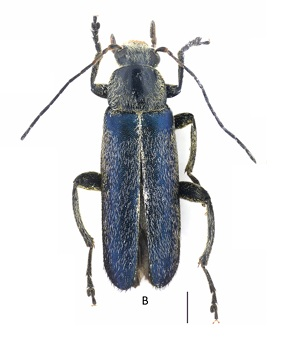

Scientific classification
- Domain: Eukaryota
- Kingdom: Animalia
- Phylum: Arthropoda
- Class: Insecta
- Order: Coleoptera
- Suborder: Polyphaga
- Infraorder: Cucujiformia
- Family: Melandryidae
- Genus: Osphya
- Species: O. azurea

Binomial name
- Osphya azurea Shi, 2025

= Osphya azurea =

Species of beetle

Osphya azurea is a species of beetle of the Melandryidae family. This species is only known from the type locality Maji in Fugong County in China.

Adults reach a length of about 8.1 mm. The elytra are metallic blue with mixed whitish and blackish recumbent setae.

== Etymology ==
The name of the species is derived from Latin azur- (meaning blue) and refers to the distinct metallic blue colour for the species.
