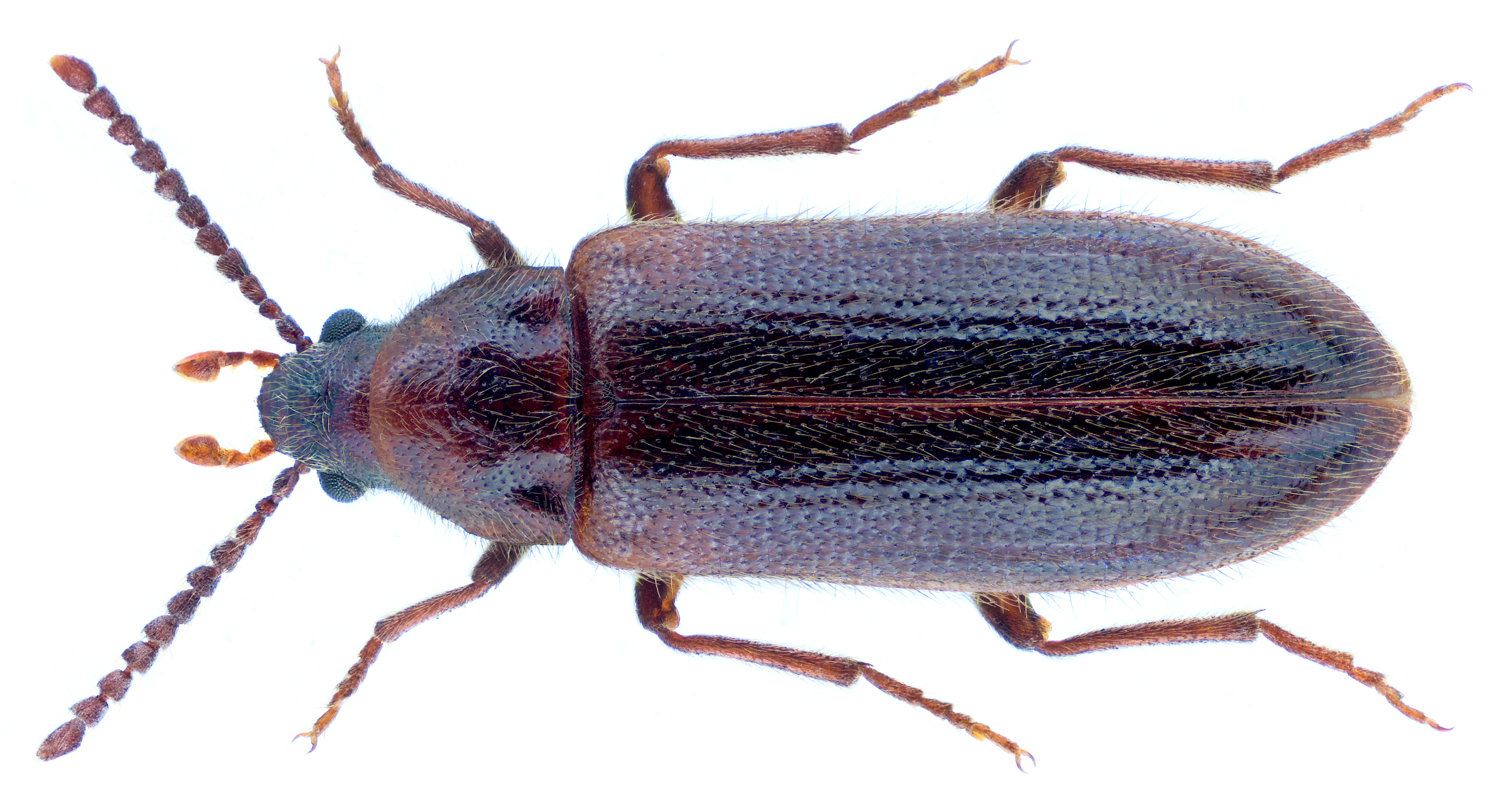

Scientific classification
- Domain: Eukaryota
- Kingdom: Animalia
- Phylum: Arthropoda
- Class: Insecta
- Order: Coleoptera
- Suborder: Polyphaga
- Infraorder: Cucujiformia
- Family: Melandryidae
- Subfamily: Melandryinae
- Genus: Zilora; Mulsant, 1856

= Zilora =

Genus of beetles

Zilora is a genus of false darkling beetles in the family Melandryidae. There are about seven described species in Zilora.

== Species ==
These seven species belong to the genus Zilora:

- Zilora canadensis Hausen, 1891^{g}
- Zilora elongata J.Sahlberg, 1881^{g}
- Zilora ferruginea (Paykull, 1798)^{g}
- Zilora hispida Leconte, 1866^{g b}
- Zilora nuda Provancher, 1877^{g}
- Zilora obscura (Fabricius, 1807)^{g}
- Zilora occidentalis Mank, 1938^{g}

Data sources: i = ITIS, c = Catalogue of Life, g = GBIF, b = Bugguide.net
