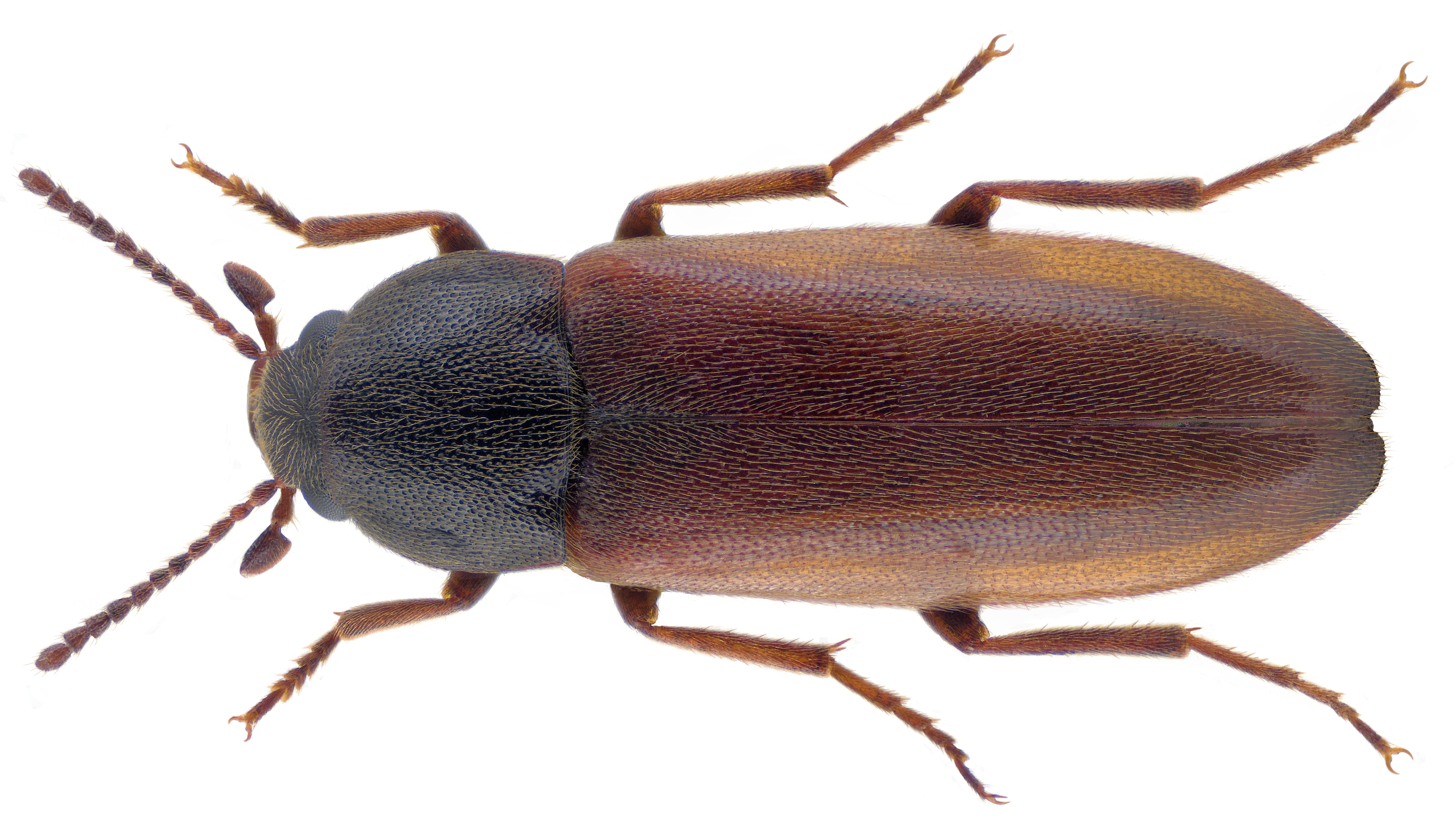
- Xylita laevigata

Scientific classification
- Domain: Eukaryota
- Kingdom: Animalia
- Phylum: Arthropoda
- Class: Insecta
- Order: Coleoptera
- Suborder: Polyphaga
- Infraorder: Cucujiformia
- Family: Melandryidae
- Genus: Xylita; Paykull, 1798

= Xylita =

Genus of beetles

Xylita is a genus of beetles belonging to the family Melandryidae.

The species of this genus are found in Europe and Northern America.

Species:

- Xylita laevigata (Hellenius, 1786)
- Xylita nagaii
