= Phryganophilus =

Scientific classification
- Domain: Eukaryota
- Kingdom: Animalia
- Phylum: Arthropoda
- Class: Insecta
- Order: Coleoptera
- Suborder: Polyphaga
- Infraorder: Cucujiformia
- Family: Melandryidae
- Genus: Phryganophilus; Sahlberg, 1834

Genus of beetles

Phryganophilus is a genus of beetles belonging to the family Melandryidae.

The species of this genus are found in Europe and Northern America.

Species:

- Phryganophilus angustatus Pic, 1953
- Phryganophilus auritus Motschulsky, 1845
