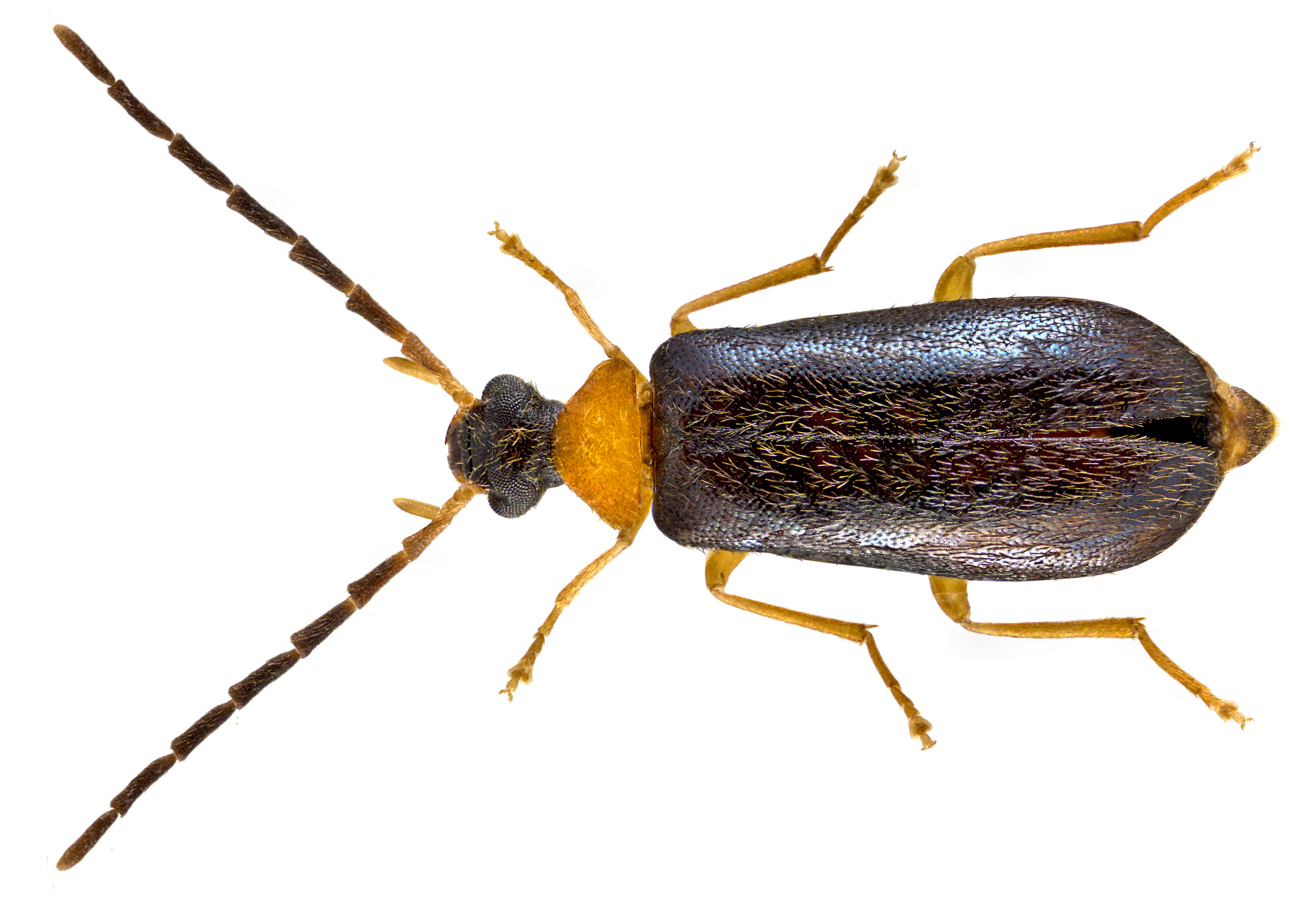
- Conopalpus brevicollis

Scientific classification
- Kingdom: Animalia
- Phylum: Arthropoda
- Class: Insecta
- Order: Coleoptera
- Suborder: Polyphaga
- Infraorder: Cucujiformia
- Family: Melandryidae
- Genus: Conopalpus; Gyllenhal, 1810

= Conopalpus =

Genus of beetles

Conopalpus is a genus of false darkling beetles in the family Melandryidae. There are at least two described species in Conopalpus.

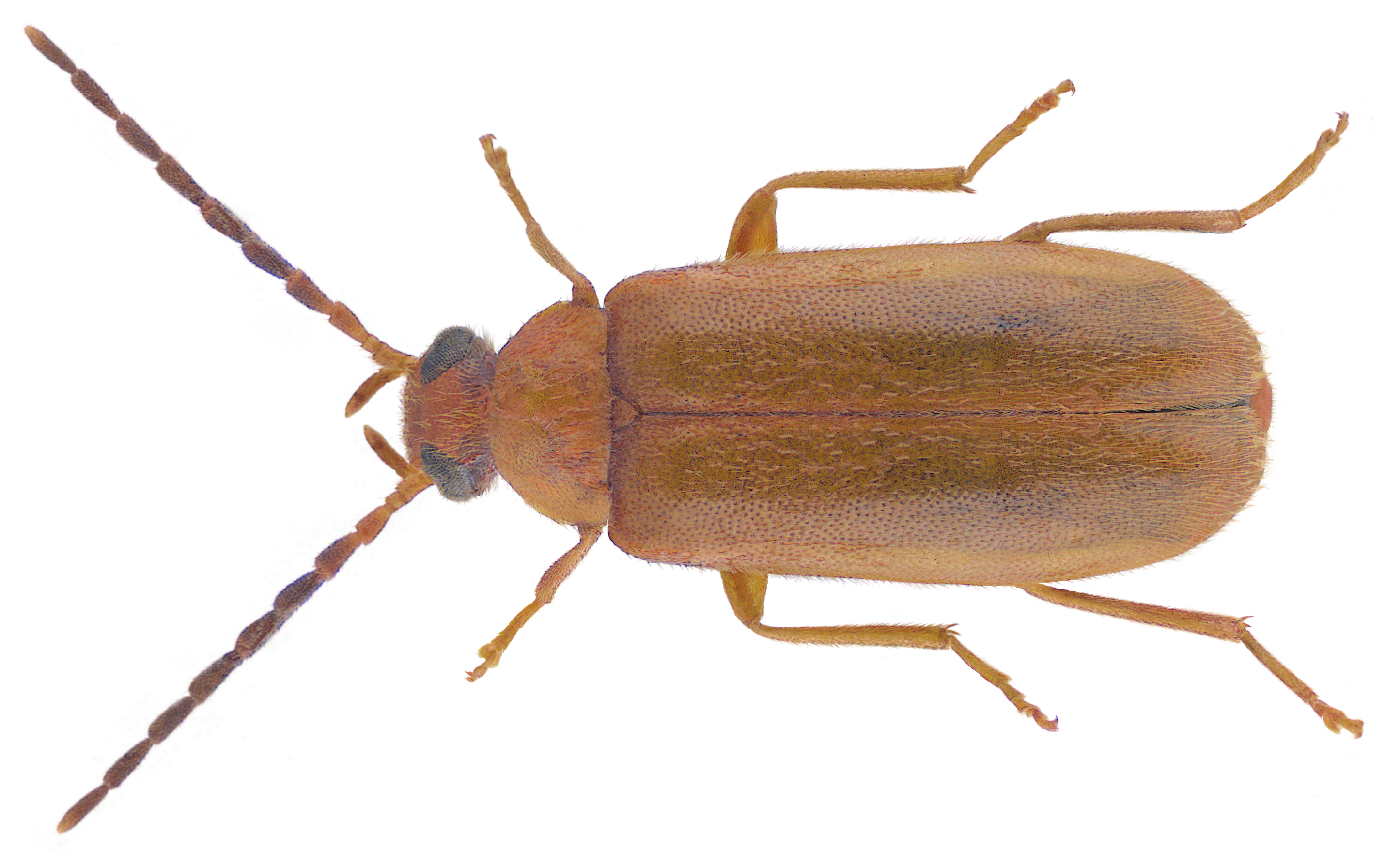
Conopalpus testaceus

== Species ==
These two species belong to the genus Conopalpus:

- Conopalpus brevicollis Kraatz, 1855^{g}
- Conopalpus testaceus (Olivier, 1790)^{g}

Data sources: i = ITIS, c = Catalogue of Life, g = GBIF, b = Bugguide.net
