= Rushia =

Scientific classification
- Kingdom: Animalia
- Phylum: Arthropoda
- Clade: Pancrustacea
- Class: Insecta
- Order: Coleoptera
- Suborder: Polyphaga
- Infraorder: Cucujiformia
- Superfamily: Tenebrionoidea
- Family: Melandryidae
- Genus: Rushia; Forel, 1893

Genus of beetles

Rushia is a genus of false darkling beetles in the family Melandryidae. There are at least three described species.

== Species ==
These species belong to the genus Rushia:

- Rushia californica (Fall, 1907)
- Rushia longula LeConte, 1862 (note, not in Lobl & Smetana, 2013 despite listing as type species)
- Rushia parreyssii (Mulsant, 1856)
