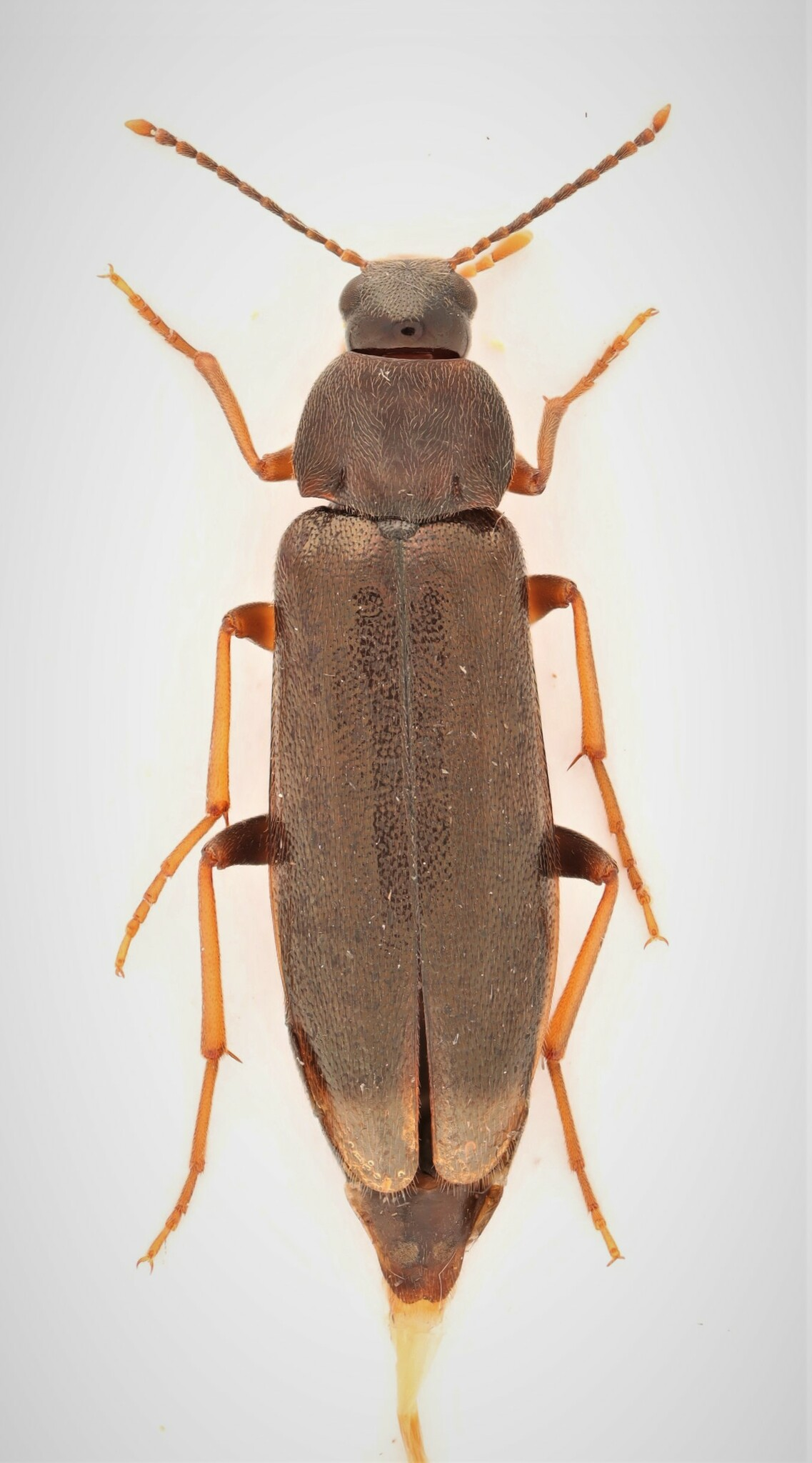
- Emmesa connectens

Scientific classification
- Domain: Eukaryota
- Kingdom: Animalia
- Phylum: Arthropoda
- Class: Insecta
- Order: Coleoptera
- Suborder: Polyphaga
- Infraorder: Cucujiformia
- Family: Melandryidae
- Subfamily: Melandryinae
- Tribe: Melandryini
- Genus: Emmesa; Newman, 1838

= Emmesa =

Genus of beetles

Emmesa is a genus of false darkling beetles in the family Melandryidae. There are about five described species in Emmesa.

== Species ==
These five species belong to the genus Emmesa:

- Emmesa blackmani Hatch, 1927
- Emmesa connectens Newman, 1838
- Emmesa labiata (Say, 1824)
- Emmesa stacesmithi Hatch, 1962
- Emmesa testacea (Van Dyke, 1928)
