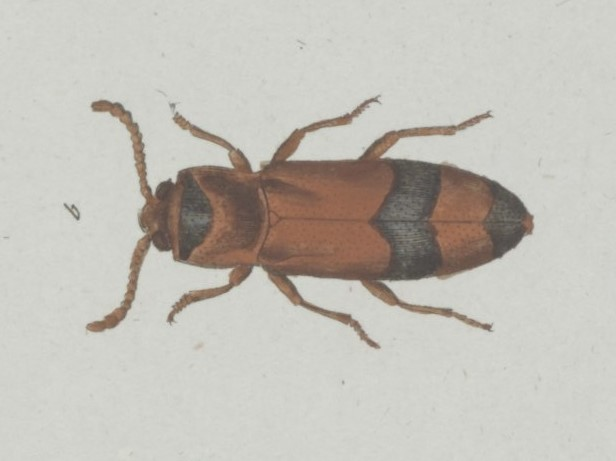
- Hypulus bifasciatus

Scientific classification
- Domain: Eukaryota
- Kingdom: Animalia
- Phylum: Arthropoda
- Class: Insecta
- Order: Coleoptera
- Suborder: Polyphaga
- Infraorder: Cucujiformia
- Family: Melandryidae
- Genus: Hypulus; Paykull, 1798

Synonyms
- Hypalus Berthold, 1827; Mystaxis Horn, 1888

= Hypulus =

Genus of beetles

Hypulus is a genus of beetles belonging to the family Melandryidae. The species of this genus are found in Europe and North America

== Species ==
The following species are recognised in the genus Hypulus:

- Hypulus bifasciatus (Fabricius, 1792)
- Hypulus californicus Van Dyke, 1928
- Hypulus cingulatus Lewis, 1895
- Hypulus quercinus (Quensel, 1790)
- Hypulus simulator Newman, 1838
