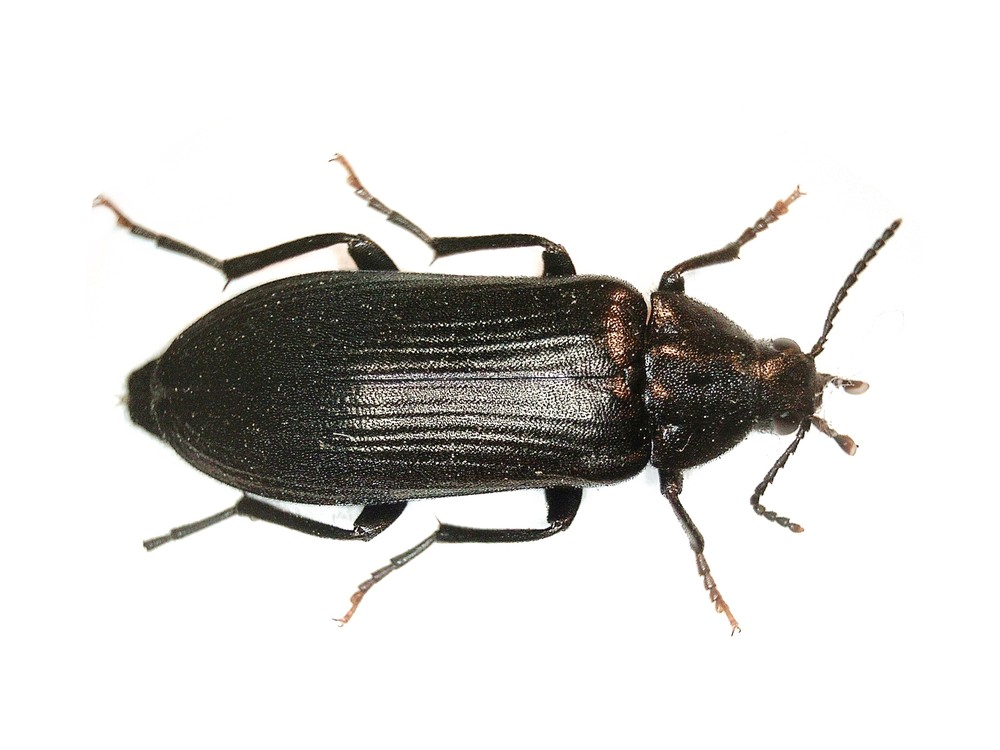
- Melandrya caraboides

Scientific classification
- Domain: Eukaryota
- Kingdom: Animalia
- Phylum: Arthropoda
- Class: Insecta
- Order: Coleoptera
- Suborder: Polyphaga
- Infraorder: Cucujiformia
- Family: Melandryidae
- Genus: Melandrya; Fabricius, 1801

Synonyms
- Apteromelandrya Gusakov, 2005; Emmesa LeConte, 1862; Serropalpus Latreille, 1796

= Melandrya =

Genus of beetles

Melandrya is a genus of beetles belonging to the family Melandryidae.

The species of this genus are found in Europe, Japan and North America.

== Species ==
The following species are recognised in the genus Melandrya:

- Melandrya barbata (Fabricius, 1787)
- Melandrya caraboides (Linnaeus, 1760)
- Melandrya coccinea (Lewis, 1895)
- Melandrya dubia (Schaller, 1783)
- Melandrya smirnovi Gusakov, 2021
- Melandrya striata Say, 1824
