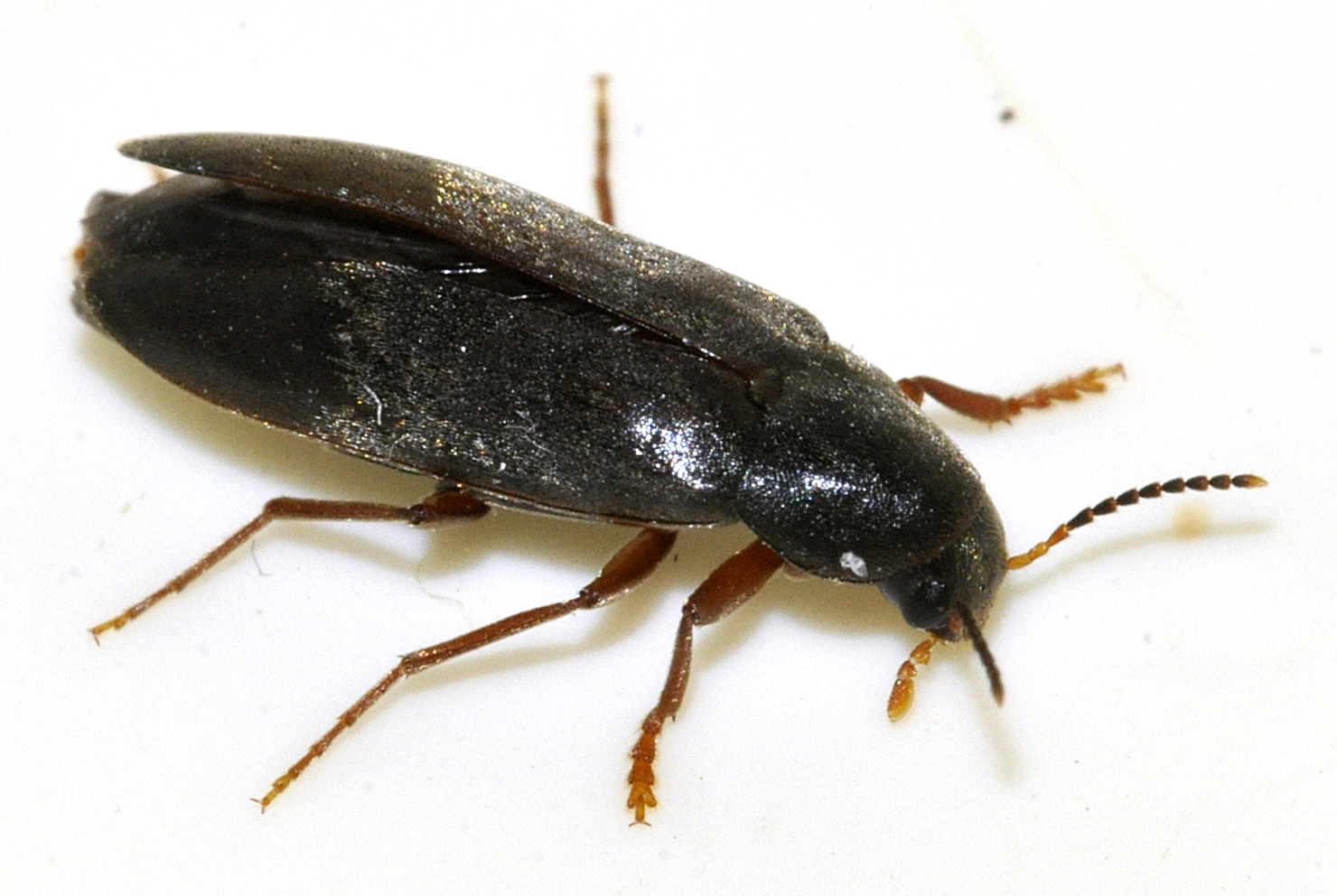
- Phloiotrya rufipes

Scientific classification
- Kingdom: Animalia
- Phylum: Arthropoda
- Class: Insecta
- Order: Coleoptera
- Suborder: Polyphaga
- Infraorder: Cucujiformia
- Family: Melandryidae
- Genus: Phloiotrya; Stephens, 1832

Synonyms
- Phloeotrya Agassiz, 1846; Phloetrya; Serropalpimorpha Pic, 1917

= Phloiotrya =

Genus of beetles

Phloiotrya is a genus of beetles in the family Melandryidae.

The species of this genus are found in Europe and North America.

== Species ==
The following species are recognised in the genus Phloiotrya:

- Phloiotrya concolor (LeConte, 1866)
- Phloiotrya fusca (LeConte, 1878)
- Phloiotrya granicollis Seidlitz, 1898
- Phloiotrya inmarinata Alekseev & Bukejs, 2021
- Phloiotrya lancifera Fauvel, 1905
- Phloiotrya nebulosa Fauvel, 1905
- Phloiotrya rufipes (Gyllenhal, 1810)
- Phloiotrya sexguttata Montrouzier, 1860
- Phloiotrya subtilis (Reitter, 1897)
- Phloiotrya tenuis (Hampe, 1850)
- Phloiotrya vaudoueri Mulsant, 1856
