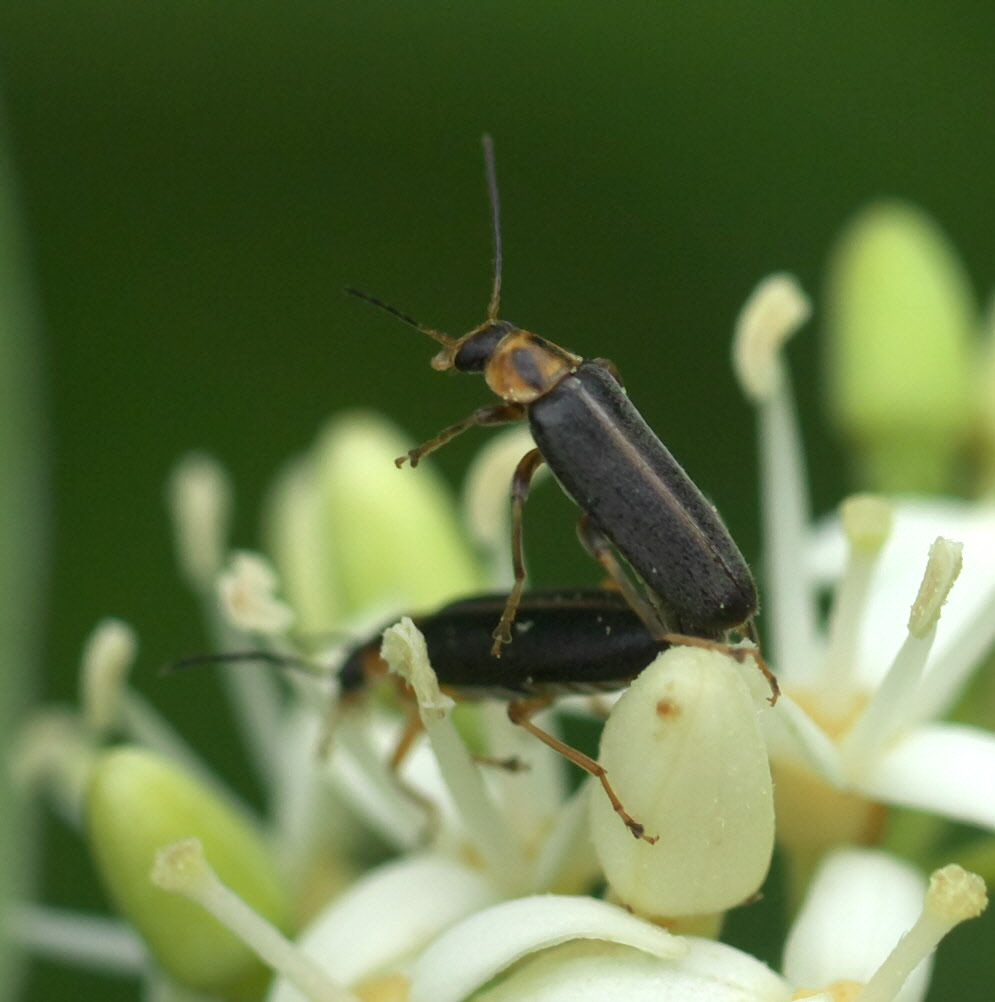
- Osphya varians

Scientific classification
- Kingdom: Animalia
- Phylum: Arthropoda
- Clade: Pancrustacea
- Class: Insecta
- Order: Coleoptera
- Suborder: Polyphaga
- Infraorder: Cucujiformia
- Family: Melandryidae
- Genus: Osphya; Illiger, 1807

= Osphya =

Genus of beetles

Osphya is a genus of false darkling beetles in the family Melandryidae. There are about seven described species in Osphya.

== Species ==
These seven species belong to the genus Osphya:

- Osphya aeneipennis Kriechbaumer, 1848^{g}
- Osphya azurea Shi, 2025
- Osphya bipunctata (Fabricius, 1775)^{g}
- Osphya clavata Shi, 2025
- Osphya flavomarginata Shi, 2025
- Osphya formosana Pic, 1910^{g}
- Osphya lutea^{b}
- Osphya trilineata Pic, 1910^{g}
- Osphya vandalitiae (Kraatz, 1868)^{g}
- Osphya varians (LeConte, 1866)^{g b}

Data sources: i = ITIS, c = Catalogue of Life, g = GBIF, b = Bugguide.net
