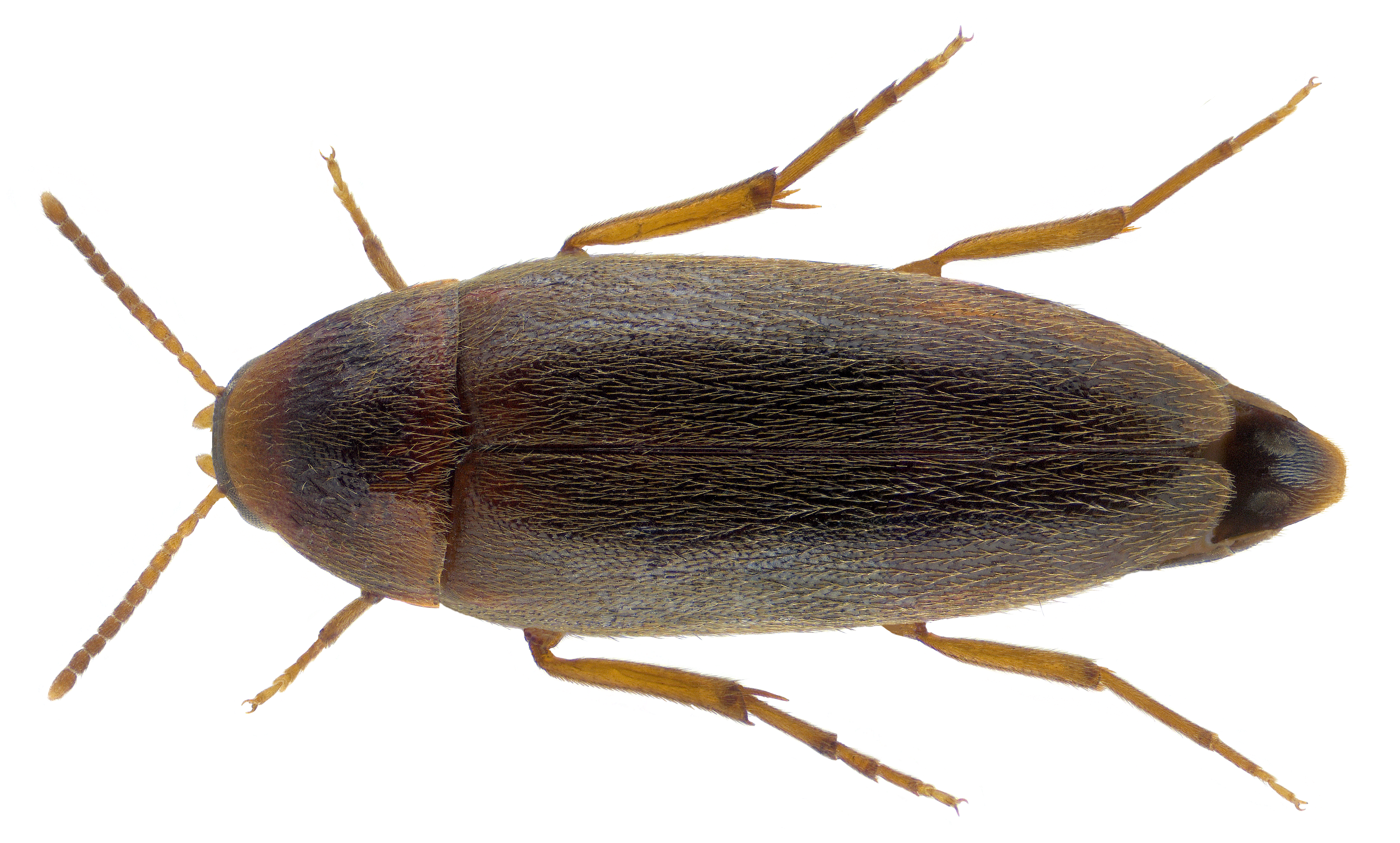
- Anisoxya fuscula

Scientific classification
- Domain: Eukaryota
- Kingdom: Animalia
- Phylum: Arthropoda
- Class: Insecta
- Order: Coleoptera
- Suborder: Polyphaga
- Infraorder: Cucujiformia
- Family: Melandryidae
- Subfamily: Melandryinae
- Tribe: Dircaeini
- Genus: Anisoxya; Mulsant, 1856

= Anisoxya =

Genus of beetles

Anisoxya is a genus of beetles belonging to the family Melandryidae.

The genus was first described by Mulsant in 1856.

Species:

- Anisoxya fuscula (Illiger, 1798)
- Anisoxya glaucula LeConte, 1866
