= Abderina =

Scientific classification
- Domain: Eukaryota
- Kingdom: Animalia
- Phylum: Arthropoda
- Class: Insecta
- Order: Coleoptera
- Suborder: Polyphaga
- Infraorder: Cucujiformia
- Family: Melandryidae
- Genus: Abderina; Seidlitz, 1898

Genus of beetles

Abderina is a genus of beetles belonging to the family Melandryidae.

The species of this genus are found in Central Europe.

Species:

- Abderina helmii Seidlitz, 1898
