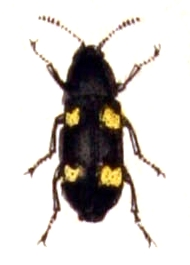
- Dircaea.quadriguttata

Scientific classification
- Domain: Eukaryota
- Kingdom: Animalia
- Phylum: Arthropoda
- Class: Insecta
- Order: Coleoptera
- Suborder: Polyphaga
- Infraorder: Cucujiformia
- Family: Melandryidae
- Genus: Dircaea; Fabricius, 1798

Synonyms
- List: Dicraea; Dircea Say, 1824; Dircoea; Hypulus Horn, 1888

= Dircaea =

Genus of beetles

Dircaea is a genus of beetles belonging to the family Melandryidae. The species of this genus are found in Europe, Japan and North America.

== Species ==
The following species are recognised in the genus Dircaea:

- Dircaea australis Fairmaire, 1856
- Dircaea horiei Hatch, 1965
- Dircaea liturata (LeConte, 1866)
- Dircaea quadriguttata (Paykull, 1798)
