= Prothalpia =

Scientific classification
- Kingdom: Animalia
- Phylum: Arthropoda
- Class: Insecta
- Order: Coleoptera
- Suborder: Polyphaga
- Infraorder: Cucujiformia
- Family: Melandryidae
- Subfamily: Melandryinae
- Tribe: Melandryini
- Genus: Prothalpia; LeConte, 1862

Genus of beetles

Prothalpia is a genus of false darkling beetles in the family Melandryidae. There are at least four described species in Prothalpia.

== Species ==
These four species belong to the genus Prothalpia:

- Prothalpia holmbergi (Mannerheim, 1852)
- Prothalpia rausuana
- Prothalpia undata LeConte, 1862
- Prothalpia utakoae Sasaji, 1988
