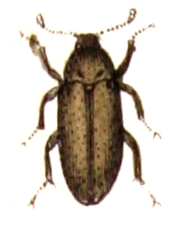

Scientific classification
- Kingdom: Animalia
- Phylum: Arthropoda
- Class: Insecta
- Order: Coleoptera
- Suborder: Polyphaga
- Infraorder: Cucujiformia
- Family: Melandryidae
- Tribe: Orchesiini
- Genus: Orchesia; Latreille, 1807

= Orchesia =

Genus of beetles

Orchesia is a genus of false darkling beetles in the family Melandryidae. There are about 19 described species in Orchesia.

== Species ==
These 19 species belong to the genus Orchesia:

- Orchesia blandula Brancsik, 1874^{g}
- Orchesia canaliculata (Alekseev & Bukejs, 2015)^{g}
- Orchesia castanea Melsheimer, 1846^{g b}
- Orchesia cultriformis Laliberte, 1967^{g b}
- Orchesia fasciata (Illiger, 1798)^{g}
- Orchesia fusiformis Solsky, 1871^{g}
- Orchesia gracilis Melsheimer, 1846^{b}
- Orchesia grandicollis Rosenhauer, 1847^{g}
- Orchesia keili Roubal, 1933^{g}
- Orchesia luteipalpis Mulsant & Guillebeau, 1857^{g}
- Orchesia maculata Mulsant & Godart, 1856^{g}
- Orchesia micans (Panzer, 1794)^{g}
- Orchesia minor Walker, 1837^{g}
- Orchesia ornata Horn, 1888^{g b}
- Orchesia ovata Laliberte, 1967^{g b}
- Orchesia rasnitzyni Nikitsky, 2011^{g}
- Orchesia rennelli Gressitt & Samuelson, 1964^{g}
- Orchesia turkini Alekseev & Bukejs, 2012^{g}
- Orchesia undulata Kraatz, 1853^{g}

Data sources: i = ITIS, c = Catalogue of Life, g = GBIF, b = Bugguide.net
