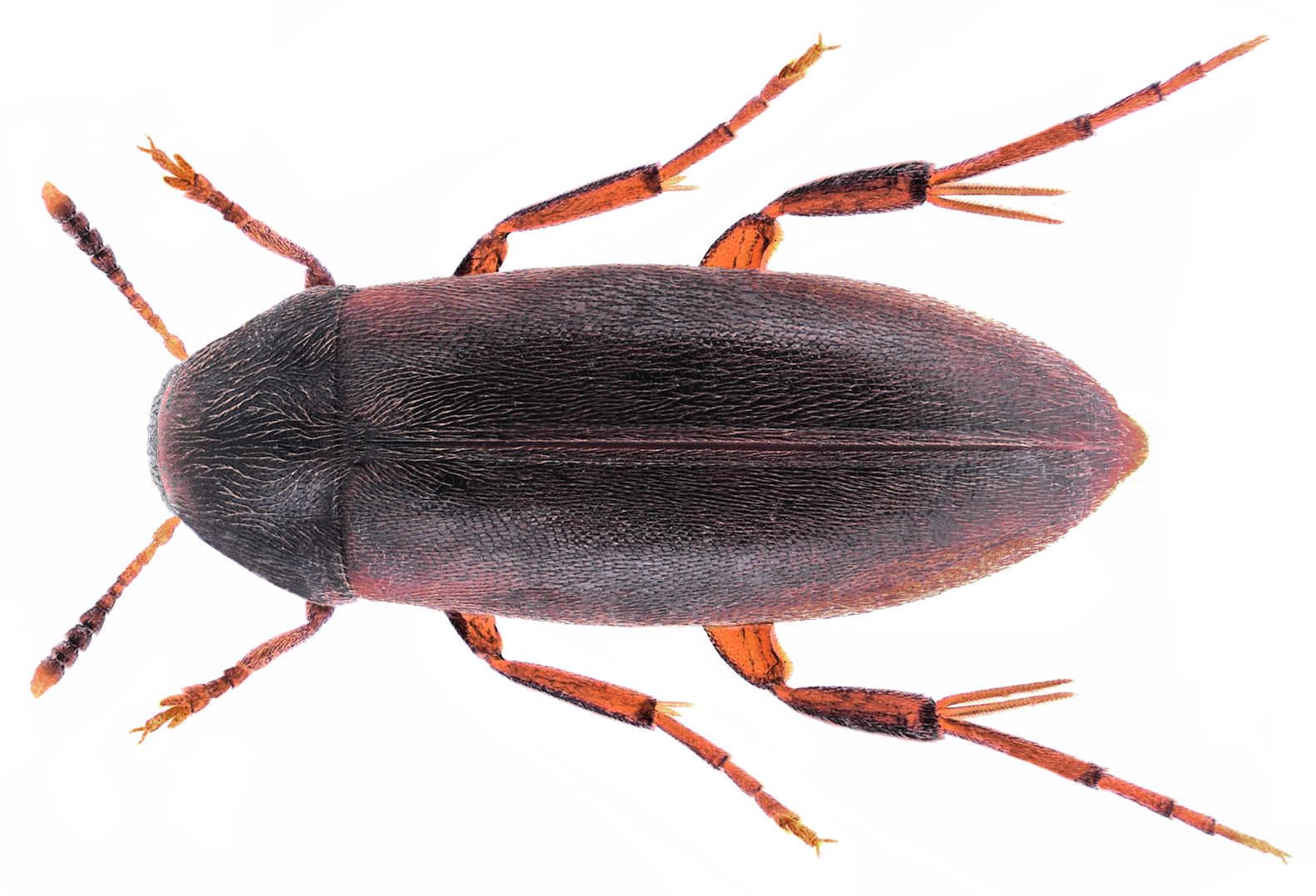
- Orchesia minor

Scientific classification
- Kingdom: Animalia
- Phylum: Arthropoda
- Clade: Pancrustacea
- Class: Insecta
- Order: Coleoptera
- Suborder: Polyphaga
- Infraorder: Cucujiformia
- Superfamily: Tenebrionoidea
- Family: Melandryidae; Leach, 1815

= Melandryidae =

Melandryidae Temporal range: Cenomanian–Recent

Family of beetles

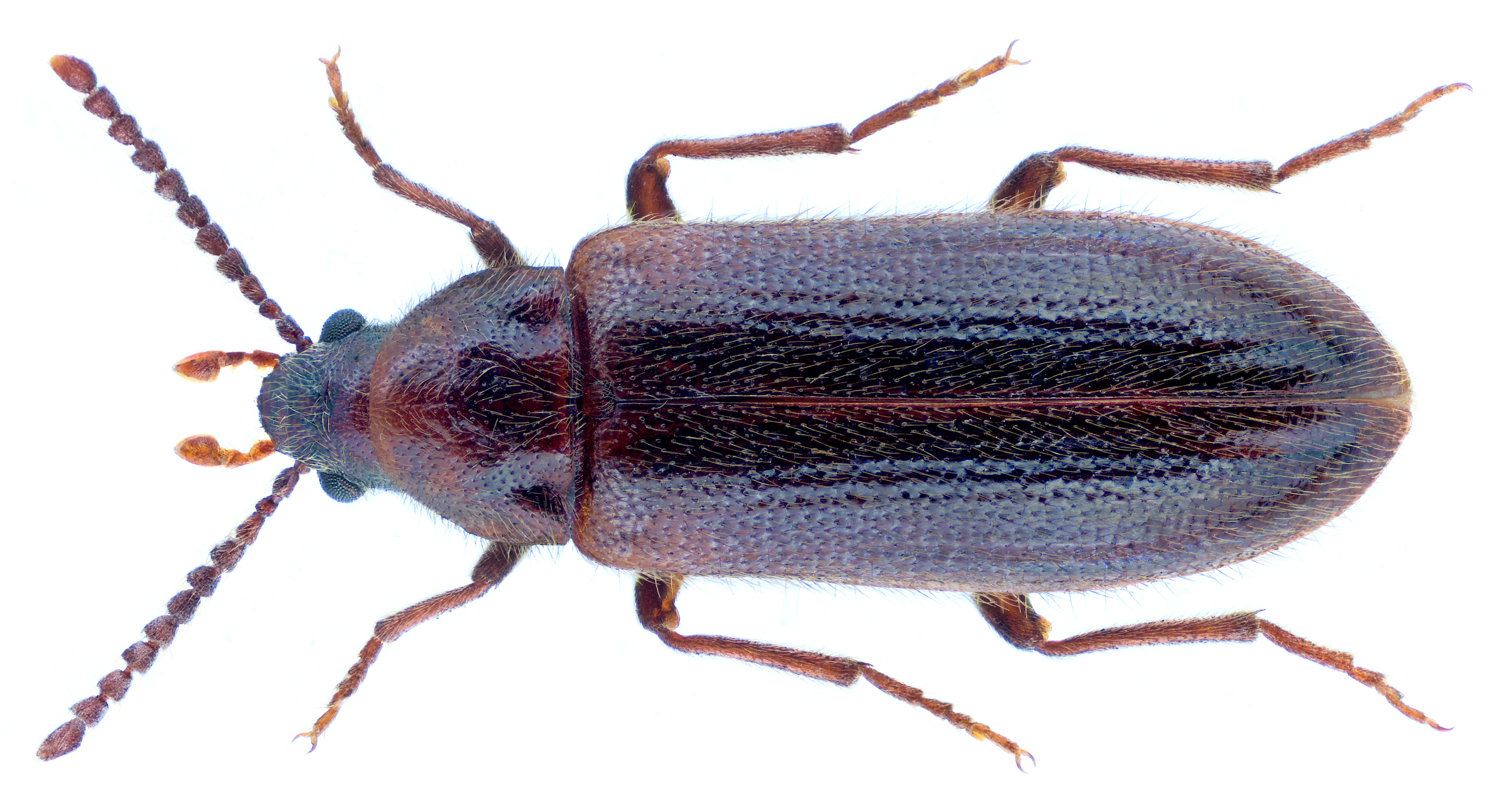
Zilora

Melandryidae is a family of beetles in the superfamily Tenebrionoidea. Members of the family are found worldwide, with around 420 species in 60 genera. Larvae and adults are generally associated with rotting wood and wood-decomposing fungi.

== Genera ==
These genera belong to the family Melandryidae:

- Abdera Stephens, 1832^{g b}
- Abderina Seidlitz, 1898^{g}
- Amblyctis Leconte, 1879^{g b}
- Anisoxya Mulsant, 1856^{g b}
- Archaeoxylita Nikitskij, 1977^{g}
- Archaeserropalpus Nikitsky, 2002^{g}
- Argyrabdera Sahlberg, 1913^{g}
- Cicindelopsis Cockerell, 1920^{g}
- Conopalpus Gyllenhal, 1810^{g}
- Cuphosis Champion, 1889^{g}
- Dircaea Fabricius, 1798^{g b}
- Dircaeomorpha Fairmaire, 1896^{g}
- Dolotarsus Jacquelin du Val, 1863^{g b}
- Electroabdera Alekseev, 2014^{g}
- Emmesa Newman, 1838^{i c g b}
- Enchodes Leconte, 1866^{g b}
- Eucinetomorphus Perris, 1875^{g}
- Hypulus Paykull, 1798^{g b}
- Lederia Reitter, 1880^{g b}
- Marolia Mulsant, 1856^{g}
- Mecorchesia Broun, 1914^{g}
- Melandrya Fabricius, 1801^{g b}
- Microscapha LeConte, 1866^{g b}
- Microtonus LeConte, 1862^{g b}
- Neogonus Hampe, 1873^{g}
- Nipponomarolia Miyatake, 1982^{g}
- Orchesia Latreille, 1807^{g b}
- Osphya Illiger, 1807^{g b}
- Phloeotrinus Nikitsky, 1989^{g}
- Phloiotrya Stephens, 1832^{g b}
- Phryganophilus C.R.Sahlberg, 1834^{g b}
- Prothalpia LeConte, 1862^{i c g b}
- Pseudocuphosis Nikitsky, 2002^{g}
- Pseudohallomenus Nikitskii, 1977^{g}
- Rushia Forel, 1893^{g b}
- Scotochroa Leconte, 1874^{g b}
- Scotochroides Mank, 1939^{g}
- Serropalpus Hellenius, 1786^{g b}
- Spilotus LeConte, 1862^{g b}
- Symphora Leconte, 1866^{g b}
- Xylita Paykull, 1798^{g b}
- Zilora Mulsant, 1856^{g b}

Data sources: i = ITIS, c = Catalogue of Life, g = GBIF, b = Bugguide.net

The oldest fossils of the family are known from mid-Cretaceous (Albian-Cenomanian) Burmese amber of Myanmar.
