= List of Brentidae genera =

This is a list of genera in the beetle family Brentidae. The family Brentidae comprises over 2190 accepted species in 415 recognised genera.

== A ==
- Abrentodes Sharp, 1895
- Abrocar Liu & Ren, 2006
- Acanthoerythrapion Ferragu, 1980
- Acarapion Kissinger, 2005
- Achrionota Pascoe, 1872
- Acramorphocephaloides Bartolozzi, 1988
- Acramorphocephalus Kleine, 1918
- Acratus Lacordaire, 1865
- Adidactus Senna, 1894
- Afrocordus Damoiseau, 1980
- Afrodermus Mantilleri, 2005
- Afrothymapion Wanat, 1990
- Afrotibicina Alonso-Zarazaga, 1984
- Agrioblepis Kleine, 1921
- Agriorrhynchus Power, 1878
- Alissapion Wanat, 2001
- Allacompsus Kleine, 1921
- Allaeometrus Senna, 1903
- Allagogus Gahan,1909
- Allodapinus Hedicke,1923
- Allomalia Alonso-Zarazaga, 1989
- Allonotapion Wanat, 2001
- Allotrichapion Voss, 1959
- Alocentron Schilsky, 1901
- Alonsiellus Zherikhin, 1996
- Amerismus Lacordaire, 1865
- Amobaeus Kleine, 1925
- Amorphocephala Damoiseau, 1966
- Amphibolocorynus Schönherr,1847
- Amphicordus Heller, 1913
- Amphithetobrentus Damoiseau, 1963
- Anacrapion Mazur,2011
- Anactorus Damoiseau, 1967
- Anampyx Damoiseau, 1963
- Ananesiotes Kleine, 1922
- Anapotapion Wanat, 2001
- Anaraiorrhinus Damoiseau, 1987
- Anchisteus Kolbe, 1883
- Ancylobrentus Damoiseau, 1965
- Ancylobrentus Kleine, 1922
- Aneorhachis Kleine, 1923
- Anepsiotes Kleine, 1917
- Ankleineella Zimmerman, 1994
- Ankleinella Zimmerman, 1994
- Anocamara Kleine, 1920
- Anomobrenthus Fairmaire, 1881
- Antliarhinites Heer,1865
- Antliarhinus Schoenherr, 1823
- Apelmonus Schoenherr, 1847
- Aphelampyx Quentin, 1966
- Apinogrammus Wanat, 2001
- Apiomorphus Wagner, 1912
- Apionion Kissinger, 1998
- Apionocybus Wanat, 2001
- Apiotherium Beguin-Billecocq, 1905
- Aplemonus Schönherr,1847
- Apocemus Calabresi,1921
- Apotapion Zimmerman, 1943
- Aprotapion Voss, 1966
- Apterapion Wanat, 2001
- Araiorrhinus Senna, 1893
- Archellerenius Wanat, 2013
- Archinvolvulus Voss, 1972
- Arkagalarhinus Legalov, 2021
- Arrenodes Schoenherr, 1823
- Atenophthalmus Kleine, 1920
- Atopobrentus Damoiseau, 1965
- Aulacoderes Chevrolat, 1839
- Austronanodes Zimmerman, 1993
- Autarcus Senna, 1892
- Autometrus Kleine, 1922
- Autosebus Kolbe, 1916
- Axelrodiellus Zherikhin & Gratshev, 2004
- Azemius Damoiseau, 1961

== B ==
- Baltoapion Legalov, 2020
- Baltoconapium Legalov, 2020
- Baryrhynchus Lacordaire, 1865
- Basenius Kolbe, 1892
- Belopherus Schoenherr, 1833
- Belorhynchus Berthold, 1827
- Betulapion Ehret, 1994
- Blysmia Pascoe, 1872
- Bolbocranius Kolbe, 1897
- Bothriorhinus Fairmaire, 1881
- Bothryopteron Wagner, 1912
- Brentus Fabricius, 1787
- Bulbogaster Lacordaire, 1865

== C ==
- Cacopsalis Sharp, 1895
- Cacoschizus Sharp, 1900
- Cacoshizus Sharp, 1900
- Caenapion Voss, 1966
- Caenosebus Kleine, 1916
- Calabresia Alonso-Zarazaga, Lyal, Bartolozzi & Sforzi, 1999
- Caledonapion Wanat, 2001
- Callipareius Senna, 1892
- Calodromus Guérin-Méneville,1832
- Calorychodes Kleine, 1925
- Calyptulus Kleine, 1922
- Carasymmorphocerus Kleine, 1922
- Carcinopisthius Kolbe, 1892
- Catablysmia Kleine, 1926
- Catagogus Kleine, 1926
- Cecidophyus Kuschel, 2003
- Ceocephalus Guérin-Méneville,1833
- Cephalobarus Schoenherr, 1840
- Ceragogus Kleine, 1925
- Cerobates Schoenherr, 1840
- Chalybdicus Kleine, 1922
- Chelorhinus Kleine, 1922
- Chilapion Kissinger, 1968
- Chrysapion Kissinger, 1968
- Circapion Kissinger, 1968
- Cistapion Wagner, 1924
- Cladobius Chevrolat, 1843
- Claeoderes Schoenherr, 1833
- Cnemopachus Schönherr,1843
- Cobalocephalus Morimoto, 1982
- Coelocephalapion Wagner, 1914
- Coelopterapion Wagner, 1912
- Conapium Motschulsky, 1866
- Cordus Schoenherr, 1847
- Corimalia Gozis, 1885
- Cormopus Kolbe, 1892
- Corporaalia Kleine, 1921
- Cosynapion Voss, 1959
- Ctenaphydes Pascoe, 1870
- Ctenomeropsis Voss, 1939
- Cybebus Schönherr,1839
- Cylas Latreille, 1802
- Cyphagogus Parry, 1849
- Cyriodontus Kirsch, 1868
- Cyrtonapion Voss, 1966

== D ==
- Dacetellum Hedicke,1922
- Damnux Lyal, 2003
- Damoisiella Alonso-Zarazaga, Lyal, Bartolozzi & Sforzi, 1999
- Debora Power, 1879
- Dentisebus De Muizon, 1960
- Desgodinsia Senna, 1894
- Diapion Wanat, 2001
- Diastrophocoleps Damoiseau, 1967
- Dieckhanniellus Alonso-Zarazaga, 1989
- Diplophyes Marshall, 1933
- Discelapion Wanat, 2001
- Dominibrentus Poinar, 2009
- Dyscheromorphus Kleine, 1916

== E ==
- Echinostroma Alonso-Zarazaga, 1991
- Ecnomobrentus Damoiseau, 1965
- Ectocemus Pascoe, 1862
- Electrapion Wagner, 1924
- Elytracantha Kleine, 1915
- Entomopisthius De Muizon, 1959
- Eoceneithycerus Legalov, 2013
- Epicoinoneus Senna, 1892
- Epispales Kirsch, 1871
- Episphales Kirsch, 1871
- Episus Billberg, 1820
- Eremoxenus Semenov-Tian-Schanskij, 1892
- Errhanodes Kuntzen, 1937
- Estenorhinus Lacordaire, 1865
- Eterodiurus Senna, 1911
- Eterozemus Senna, 1903
- Eubactrus Lacordaire, 1865
- Eugeniobrentus Damoiseau, 1963
- Eumecopodus Calabresi,1920
- Eupeithes Senna, 1898
- Euprotapion Wagner, 1927
- Eupsalomorphus Kleine, 1926
- Eurorhinus Damoiseau, 1961
- Euschizus Kleine, 1922
- Eusystellus Kleine, 1917
- Eutrachelus Berthold, 1827
- Eutrichapion Reitter 1916
- Exapion Bedel, 1887

== F ==
- Fallapion Kissinger, 1968
- Falsoconapion Voss, 1962
- Falsotanaos Legalov, 2014
- Femtapion Kissinger, 1991
- Fonteboanius Senna, 1893

== G ==
- Genogogus Kleine, 1925
- Giustiapion Legalov, 2003
- Gobicar Gratshev & Zherikhin, 1999
- Gratshevibelus Soriano, 2009
- Guyanapion Rheinheimer, 2007
- Gyalostoma Kleine, 1914
- Gyllenhalia Aurivillius, 1885
- Gynandrorhynchus Lacordaire, 1865

== H ==
- Hadramorphocephalus Kleine, 1918
- Harpapion Voss, 1966
- Haywardiales HaedoRossi, 1965
- Hecyrapion Kissinger, 2005
- Hellerenius Wanat, 2001
- Hemicordus Kleine, 1922
- Hemiorychodes Kleine, 1921
- Hemipsalis Sharp, 1895
- Hemisamblus Kleine, 1925
- Henarrhodes Heller, 1913
- Henorychodes Kleine, 1921
- Hephebocerus Schoenherr, 1840
- Hetaeroceocephalus Kleine, 1921
- Heterapion Sharp, 1891
- Heteroblysmia Kleine, 1917
- Heterobrenthus Sharp, 1895
- Heterorrhynchus Calabresi,1921
- Heterothesis Kleine, 1914
- Heterothesis Schoenherr, 1823
- Hexatmetus Marshall, 1927
- Higonius Lewis1883
- Higonodes Zimmerman, 1993
- Himantapion Wanat, 2001
- Hispanocar Soriano, Gratshev & Delclòs, 2006
- Hogonodes Zimmerman, 1994
- Holobrenthus Kleine, 1923
- Homophylus Kleine, 1920
- Hopliterrhynchus Senna, 1892
- Hoplopisthius Senna, 1892
- Hormocerus Schoenherr, 1823
- Hovasius Senna, 1895
- Howeius Mantilleri, 2011
- Hteroblysmia Kleine, 1917
- Hyperephanus Senna, 1892
- Hypomiolispa Kleine, 1918
- Hypophyes Reitter 1916
- Hyposphales Kleine, 1927
- Hypotrachelizus Kleine, 1933

== I ==
- Indophyes Friedman, 2012
- Ischnomerus Labram & Imhoff, 1838
- Ischyromerus Labram & Imhoff, 1838
- Isexapion Voss, 1966
- Isoceocephalus Kleine, 1920
- Isomorphus Kleine, 1916
- Ithystenomorphus Kleine, 1919
- Ithystenus Pascoe, 1862
- Ixapion Roudier & Tempère, 1973

== K ==
- Kelainapion Zimmerman, 1993
- Kissingeria Alonso-Zarazaga, 1990
- Kleineella Strand, 1918
- Kleinella Kasantsev, 1992
- Kolbrentus Alonso-Zarazaga, Lyal, Bartolozzi & Sforzi, 1999

== L ==
- Lasiorhynchus Lacordaire, 1865
- Leaoapion Zimmerman, 1993
- Lepanomus Balfour-Browne,1945
- Leptamorphocephalus Kleine, 1918
- Leptocymatium Kleine, 1922
- Leptomiolispa Kleine, 1933
- Lissapion Zimmerman, 1993
- Loborhynchapion Gyérffy, 1956
- Longotanaos Legalov, 2014
- Lopatinapion Friedman, 2013
- Lyalia Alonso-Zarazaga & Perrin, 2011

== M ==
- Macropareia Kleine, 1932
- Manoja Pajni & Bhateja, 1982
- Margaritapion Korotyaev, 1990
- Martinsnetoa Zherikhin & Gratshev, 2004
- Mecolenus Schönherr,1847
- Megalosebus Kolbe, 1916
- Megapion Bhateja & Pajni, 1989
- Megateras Kleine, 1921
- Megatracheloides Lucas, 1920
- Meperapion Voss, 1962
- Meregallia Alonso-Zarazaga, 1990
- Mesetia Blackburn, 1896
- Mesito Kleine, 1919
- Mesoderes Senna, 1898
- Mesotylapion Voss, 1966
- Metapion Schilsky, 1906
- Metatrachelus Kleine, 1925
- Metusambius Kolbe, 1916
- Micramorphocephalus Kleine, 1918
- Microcerus Schoenherr, 1833
- Microon Alonso-Zarazaga, 1989
- Microsebus Kolbe, 1892
- Microtinocyba Legalov, 2001
- Microtrachelizus Senna, 1893
- Miltapion Voss, 1966
- Miniapion Korotyaev, 1992
- Miolispa Pascoe, 1862
- Miolispoides Senna, 1894
- Monrosiaia HaedoRossi, 1960
- Montsecanomalus Soriano, Gratshev & Delclòs, 2006
- Myrmacyba Heller, 1929
- Myrmecobrenthus Kleine, 1920
- Myrmeocbretnus Kleine, 1920
- Mythapion Kissinger, 2005

== N ==
- Nannobrenthus Kolbe, 1916
- Nanodactylus Blatchley, 1922
- Nanodiscus Kiesenwetter, 1864
- Nanomyrmacyba Wanat, 1990
- Nanophyes Schénherr, 1838
- Neacratus Alonso-Zarazaga, Lyal, Bartolozzi & Sforzi, 1999
- Neapion Alonso-Zarazaga, 1990
- Necatapion Freidman& Freidberg, 2007
- Nemobrenthus Sharp, 1895
- Nemocephalinus Kleine, 1927
- Nemocephalus Guérin-Méneville,1827
- Nemocoryna Sharp, 1895
- Nemorhinus Schoenherr, 1823
- Neoceocephalus Senna, 1898
- Neocyba Kissinger, 1968
- Neocyphagogus Damoiseau, 1979
- Neohigonius Goossens2005
- Neomygaleicus De Muizon, 1960
- Neosebus Senna, 1903
- Neoxybasius Kolbe, 1916
- Neozemioses Damoiseau, 1989
- Nesidiobrentus Damoiseau, 1964
- Notapion Zimmerman, 1993
- Noterapion Kissinger, 2002
- Nothogaster Lacordaire, 1865

== O ==
- Odontelytron Sforzi & Mantilleri, 2007
- Odontopareius Damoiseau, 1964
- Omphalapion Schilsky, 1901
- Oncodemerus Senna, 1892
- Onychapion Schilsky, 1901
- Opisthenoxys Kleine, 1922
- Opisthozemius Kolbe, 1916
- Orfilaia HaedoRossi, 1955
- Orychodes Pascoe, 1862
- Osellaeus Alonso-Zarazaga, 1990
- Oxycorax Alonso-Zarazaga, 1990
- Oxyscapanus Damoiseau, 1989
- Ozodecerus Chevrolat, 1839

== P ==
- Palaeoceocephalus Kleine, 1920
- Palaeoparagogus Damoiseau, 1979
- Paleopegorhinus Poinar, Brown & Legalov, 2021
- Paoconapion Voss, 1959
- Papuapion Korotyaev, 1987
- Paraceocephalus Kleine, 1944
- Paraclidorhinus Senna, 1903
- Paradidactus Quentin, 1966
- Paragogus Kleine, 1926
- Paramicrosebus Damoiseau, 1962
- Paramorphocephalus Kleine, 1920
- Parapisthius Kleine, 1935
- Paraprophthalmus Kleine, 1922
- Pararrhenodes HaedoRossi, 1954
- Parasebaius De Muizon, 1955
- Parasebasius De Muizon, 1955
- Parasynapion Legalov, 2003
- Parateramocerus Mantilleri, 2015
- Paratrachelizus Kleine, 1921
- Parorychodes Kleine, 1921
- Parusambius Kleine, 1925
- Paryphobrenthus Kolbe, 1897
- Paussobrenthus Gestro, 1919
- Perapion Wagner, 1907
- Peraprophthalmus Kleine, 1923
- Pericartiellus Alonso-Zarazaga, 1989
- Periceocephalus Kleine, 1922
- Pericordus Kolbe, 1883
- Perisymmorphocerus Kleine, 1919
- Peritrachelizus Kleine, 1922
- Perorychodes Kleine, 1925
- Perroudia Damoiseau, 1962
- Pertusius Mantilleri, 2016
- Phacecerus Schoenherr, 1840
- Phocylides Pascoe, 1872
- Pholidochlamys Lacordaire, 1865
- Phoroctenus Marshall, 1927
- Phymechus Senna, 1895
- Piazocnemis Lacordaire, 1865
- Piezaplemonus Wanat, 1990
- Pithoderes Calabresi,1920
- Pittodes Kleine, 1922
- Platymerus Schoenherr, 1836
- Plesiobolbus Kolbe, 1916
- Plesiophocylides Kleine, 1925
- Pnoia Alonso-Zarazaga, 2020
- Podapion Riley, 1883
- Podozemius Kolbe, 1916
- Pogonapion Wanat, 2001
- Pretanaos Legalov, 2014
- Prodector Pascoe, 1862
- Proephebocerus Calabresi,1920
- Proepisphales Kleine, 1922
- Pronomacrus Kleine, 1929
- Prophthalmus Lacordaire, 1865
- Proteramocerus Kleine, 1921
- Protoceratapion Wanat, 1995
- Protoproctus Kolbe, 1916
- Prototrichapiini Wanat, 1995
- Protusambius Kolbe, 1916
- Pseudamobaeus Damoiseau, 1967
- Pseudanchisteus Kleine, 1922
- Pseudoadidactus De Muizon, 1955
- Pseudobelopherus Calabresi,1920
- Pseudoceocephalus Kleine, 1920
- Pseudoconapion Vose, 1959
- Pseudocyphagonus Desbrochers des Loges, 1890
- Pseudohigonius Damoiseau, 1987
- Pseudomiolispa Kleine, 1926
- Pseudomygaleicus De Muizon, 1960
- Pseudoparagogus De Muizon, 1955
- Pseudophocylides Kleine, 1920
- Pseudopiezotrachelus Wagner, 1907
- Pseudopisthenoxys Kleine, 1942
- Pseudorhinapion Voss, 1959
- Pseudorychodes Senna, 1894
- Pseudotychius Blatchley, 1922
- Pseudousambius De Muizon, 1955
- Pterapion Faust,1889
- Pterygostomus Lacordaire, 1865
- Pycnotarsobrentus Maruyama & Bartolozzi, 2014
- Pygidiapion De Sousa & Mermudes, 2021
- Pyresthema Kleine, 1922
- Pystapion Kissinger, 2005

== R ==
- Raphirhynchidus Kleine, 1927
- Raphirhynchus De jean, 1834
- Raphirhynchus Schönherr,1840
- Rhadinocyba Faust,1889
- Rhamnapion Kissinger, 2005
- Rhinapion Beguin-Billecocq, 1905
- Rhinopteryx Lacordaire, 1865
- Rhinorhynchidius Voss, 1922
- Rhopalapion Schilsky, 1906
- Rhynchoneus Sharp, 1895
- Rhynolaccus Guérin, 1831
- Rugosacratus Mantilleri, 2015

== S ==
- Sayapion Kissinger, 1999
- Scapapion Korotyaev, 1992
- Schizephebocerus Kleine, 1923
- Schizoadidactus Kleine, 1916
- Schizoeupsalis Kleine, 1917
- Schizotrachelus Lacordaire, 1865
- Schizuropterus Kleine, 1925
- Schoenfeldtia Senna, 1893
- Schoenfeldtiopsis Soares& Scivittaro, 1977
- Schoenius Alonso-Zarazaga, 1991
- Sclerotrachelus Kleine, 1921
- Sebasius Lacordaire, 1865
- Sennaiella Alonso-Zarazaga, Lyal, Bartolozzi & Sforzi, 1999
- Sergiola Korotyaev, 1995
- Setapion Balfour-Browne,1944
- †Slonik Zherikhin, 1977
- Spatherhinus Power, 1879
- Stenapion Wagner, 1912
- Stenobrentus Damoiseau, 1966
- Stenopterapion Bokor, 1923
- Stenorhynchapion Wagner, 1932
- Stenorhynchus Berthold, 1827
- Sterculapion Rheinheimer, 1997
- Stereobates Sharp, 1895
- Stereobatinus Kleine, 1927
- Stereodermus Lacordaire, 1865
- Sterobatinus Kleine, 1927
- Steroderminus Kleine, 1927
- Stibacephalus Kleine, 1916
- Storeosomus Lacordaire, 1865
- Stratiorrhina Pascoe, 1872
- Stratiorrhynchus Damoiseau, 1962
- Strobilobius Kuschel, 2003
- Stroggylosternum Kleine, 1922
- Stynapion Schilsky, 1902
- Suborychodes Kleine, 1917
- Succinapion Legalov, & Bukejs, 2014
- Syggenithystenus Kleine, 1919
- Symmorphocerus Schoenherr, 1847
- Synorychodes Kleine, 1921
- Synsebasius Kolbe, 1916
- Systellus Kleine, 1917

== T ==
- Taphrocomister Senna, 1894
- Taphroderes Schoenherr, 1823
- Taphroderoides Scivittaro, 1975
- Taphroderomimus Kleine, 1927
- Taphroderopsis Scivittaro, 1975
- Temnolaimus Chevrolat, 1839
- Teramoceroides Mantilleri, 2015
- Teramocerus Schoenherr, 1840
- Teraticorhynchus Kleine, 1925
- Tetanocephalus Kleine, 1916
- Tetrapion Wanat, 2001
- Thaumastopsis Kleine, 1921
- Thoracobrenthus Damoiseau, 1961
- Thunbergapion Alonso-Zarazaga, 2013
- Thyridapion Wanat, 2001
- Tinoteramocerus Kleine, 1927
- Tmetogonus Senna, 1895
- Toxobrentus Damoiseau, 1965
- Trachelizus De jean, 1834
- Trachelizus Gyllenhal, 1833
- Tracheloschizus Damoiseau, 1966
- Trachoconapion Korotyaev, 1985
- Trichapion Wagner, 1912
- Trichoconapion Korotyaev, 1985
- Tulotus Senna, 1894

== U ==
- Ubaniopsis Soares, 1970
- Ubanius Senna, 1895
- Ulocerus Schoenherr, 1823
- Ulyaniana Zherichin, 1993
- Ulyanisca Gratshev, 1999
- Uroptera Berthold, 1827
- Uropteroides Kleine, 1922
- Usambioproctus Kolbe, 1916
- Usambioprotus Kolbe, 1916
- Usambius Kolbe, 1892

== V ==
- Vasseletia Sharp, 1895
- Vietapion Korotyaev, 1987
- Vietobrentus Kabakov, 2001

== X ==
- Xenadidactus Damoiseau, 1979
- Xenoon Alonso-Zarazaga, 1986
- Xestothorax Damoiseau, 1989

== Z ==
- Zelapterus Kuschel, 2003
- Zemioses Pascoe, 1862
- Zetophloeus Lacordaire, 1865
- Zeugonyx Notman, 1922
- Zherikhiniellus Legalov, 2021
- Zimmius Wanat, 2001
