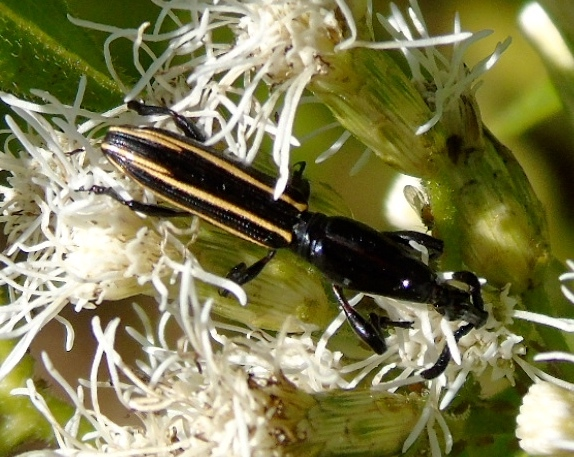
- Brentus anchorago

Scientific classification
- Kingdom: Animalia
- Phylum: Arthropoda
- Clade: Pancrustacea
- Class: Insecta
- Order: Coleoptera
- Suborder: Polyphaga
- Infraorder: Cucujiformia
- Superfamily: Curculionoidea
- Family: Brentidae
- Subfamily: Brentinae
- Tribe: Brentini; Billberg, 1820

Synonyms
- Brenthides Billberg, 1820

= Brentini =

Tribe of beetles

The Brentini are a tribe of beetles in the subfamily of weevils known as Brentinae: both were based on the type genus Brentus and erected by Gustaf Johan Billberg in 1820.

== Subtribes and genera ==
BioLib includes three subtribes:

=== Arrhenodina ===
Authority: Lacordaire, 1865 (also known tribe Arrhenodini)

1. Abrentodes Sharp, 1895
2. Agriorrhynchus Power, 1878
3. Allacompsus Kleine, 1921
4. Amphicordus Heller, 1913
5. Ananesiotes Kleine, 1922
6. Anepsiotes Kleine, 1917
7. Anomobrenthus Fairmaire, 1881
8. Apocemus Calabresi, 1921
9. Arrenodes Shoenherr, 1823
10. Baryrhynchus Lacordaire, 1865
11. Belopherus Schoenherr, 1833
12. Blysmia Pascoe, 1872
13. Cacopsalis Sharp, 1895
14. Calabresia Alonso-Zarazaga & Lyal, 1999
15. Calorychodes Kleine, 1925
16. Catablysmia Kleine, 1926
17. Claeoderes Schoenherr, 1833
18. Corporaalia Kleine, 1921
19. Cyriodontus Kirsch, 1868
20. Damoisiella Alonso-Zarazaga, Lyal, Bartolozzi & Sforzi 1999
21. Debora (weevil) Power, 1879
22. Desgodinsia Senna, 1894
23. Ectocemus Pascoe, 1862
24. Elytracantha Kleine, 1915
25. Epicoinoneus Senna, 1892
26. Episphales Kirsch, 1871
27. Estenorhinus Lacordaire, 1866
28. Eupeithes (weevil) Senna, 1898
29. Eupsalomorphus Kleine, 1926
30. Eutrachelus Berthold, 1827
31. Gyalostoma Kleine, 1914
32. Haywardiales Haedo Rossi, 1964
33. Hemiorychodes Kleine, 1921
34. Hemipsalis Sharp, 1895
35. Henarrhodes Heller, 1913
36. Henorychodes Kleine, 1921
37. Heteroblysmia Kleine, 1917
38. Heterobrenthus Sharp, 1895
39. Heterorrhynchus Calabresi, 1921
40. Holobrenthus Kleine, 1923
41. Hopliterrhynchus Senna, 1892
42. Hyposphales Kleine, 1927
43. Megateras Kleine, 1921
44. Mesitogenus Kleine, 1919
45. Nemorhinus Schoenherr, 1823
46. Orfilaia Haedo Rossi, 1955
47. Orychodes Pascoe, 1862
48. Paraprophthalmus Kleine, 1922
49. Pararrhenodes Haedo Rossi, 1954
50. Parorychodes Kleine, 1921
51. Perorychodes Kleine, 1925
52. Phymechus Senna, 1895
53. Proepisphales Kleine, 1922
54. Prophthalmus Lacordaire, 1865
55. Pseudobelopherus Calabresi, 1920
56. Pseudomiolispa Kleine, 1926
57. Pseudorychodes Senna, 1894
58. Raphirhynchidus Kleine, 1927
59. Raphirhynchus Dejean, 1834
60. Rhynchoneus Sharp, 1895
61. Schizoeupsalis Kleine, 1917
62. Schoenfeldtia Senna, 1893
63. Schoenfeldtiopsis Soares & Scivittaro, 1977
64. Spatherhinus Power, 1879
65. Stratiorrhina Pascoe, 1872
66. Stratiorrhynchus Damoiseau, 1962
67. Suborychodes Kleine, 1917
68. Synorychodes Kleine, 1921
69. Teraticorhynchus Kleine, 1925
70. Tmetogonus Senna, 1895
71. Toxobrentus Damoiseau, 1965
72. Ubaniopsis Soares, 1970
73. Ubanius Senna, 1895

subtribe Brentina Billberg, 1820

1. Brentus Fabricius, 1787

=== Eremoxenina ===
Authority: Semenov, 1892

1. Acramorphocephalus Kleine, 1918
2. Afrocordus Damoiseau, 1980
3. Amorphocephala Damoiseau, 1966
4. Ankleinella Zimmerman, 1994
5. Carasymmorphocerus Kleine, 1922
6. Cobalocephalus Morimoto, 1982
7. Cordus (weevil) Schoenherr, 1847
8. Eremoxenus Semenov, 1892
9. Hadramorphocephalus Kleine, 1918
10. Hemicordus Kleine, 1922
11. Kleineella Strand, 1918
12. Leptamorphocephalus Kleine, 1918
13. Micramorphocephalus Kleine, 1918
14. Myrmecobrenthus Kleine, 1920
15. Paramorphocephalus Kleine, 1920
16. Paussobrenthus Gestro, 1919
17. Pericordus Kolbe, 1883
18. Perisymmorphocerus Kleine, 1919
19. Symmorphocerus Schoenherr, 1847
20. Systellus Kleine, 1917

=== Unplaced genera ===
1. Ankleineella Zimmerman, 1994
2. Cephalobarus Schoenherr, 1840
