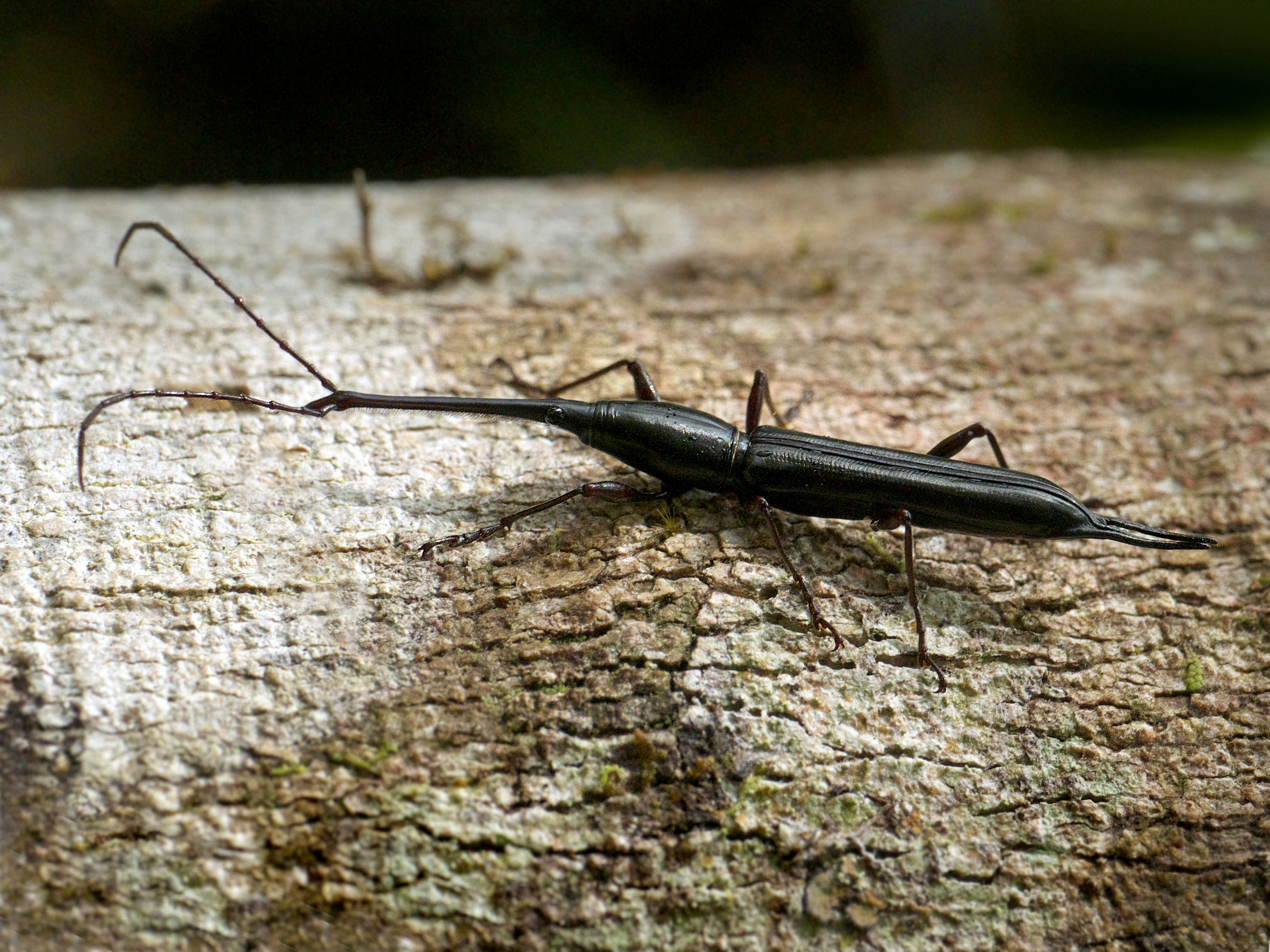
- Straight-snouted Brentid Weevil Zetophloeus sp.

Scientific classification
- Domain: Eukaryota
- Kingdom: Animalia
- Phylum: Arthropoda
- Class: Insecta
- Order: Coleoptera
- Suborder: Polyphaga
- Infraorder: Cucujiformia
- Family: Brentidae
- Subfamily: Brentinae
- Tribe: Trachelizini; Lacordaire, 1865

= Trachelizini =

Tribe of beetles

Trachelizini is a tribe of weevils now placed in the subfamily Brentinae; the following subtribes are recognised:

1. Acratina Alonso-Zarazaga, Lyal, Bartolozzi & Sforzi, 1999
2. Atopobrentina Damoiseau, 1965
3. Hephebocerina Lacordaire, 1866
4. Ithystenina Lacordaire, 1865
5. Microtrachelizina Zimmerman, 1994
6. Pseudoceocephalina Kleine, 1922
7. Rhyticephalina Kleine, 1922
8. Trachelizina Lacordaire, 1865
9. Tychaeina Schoenfeldt, 1908
10. Unplaced genera:
  1. Howeius Mantilleri, 2011
  2. Odontelytron Sforzi & Mantilleri, 2007

== Genera ==
These genera belong to the tribe Trachelizini:

- Achrionota Pascoe, 1872^{i c g}
- Acratus Lacordaire, 1865-12^{i c g}
- Agrioblepis Kleine, 1921^{i c g}
- Allodapinus Hedicke, 1923^{i c g}
- Amerismus Lacordaire, 1866^{i c g}
- Anactorus Damoiseau, 1967^{i c g}
- Anampyx Damoiseau, 1963^{i c g}
- Anchisteus Kolbe, 1883^{i c g}
- Aneorhachis Kleine, 1923^{i c g}
- Anocamara Kleine, 1920^{i c g}
- Aphelampyx Quentin, 1966^{i c g}
- Araiorrhinus Senna, 1893^{i c g}
- Atenophthalmus Kleine, 1920^{i c g}
- Autarcus Senna, 1892^{i c g}
- Bothriorhinus Fairmaire, 1881^{i c g}
- Bulbogaster Lacordaire, 1866^{i c g}
- Calyptulus Kleine, 1922^{i c g}
- Ceocephalus Guérin-Méneville, 1833^{i c g}
- Chalybdicus Kleine, 1922^{i c g}
- Dacetellum Hedicke, 1922^{i c g}
- Entomopisthius Muizon, 1959^{i c g}
- Eterodiurus Senna, 1911^{i c g}
- Eubactrus Lacordaire, 1866^{i c g}
- Eumecopodus Calabresi, 1920^{i c g}
- Euschizus Kleine, 1922^{i c g}
- Fonteboanius Senna, 1893^{i c g}
- Gynandrorhynchus Lacordaire, 1866^{i c g}
- Hemisamblus Kleine, 1925^{i c g}
- Hephebocerus Schoenherr, 1840^{i c g}
- Hetaeroceocephalus Kleine, 1921^{i c g}
- Heterothesis Kleine, 1914^{i c g}
- Higonius Lewis, 1883^{i c g}
- Homophylus Kleine, 1920^{i c g}
- Hormocerus Schoenherr, 1823^{i c g}
- Hovasius Senna, 1895^{i c g}
- Hypomiolispa Kleine, 1918^{i c g}
- Hypotrachelizus Kleine, 1933^{i c g}
- Ischnomerus Labram & Imhoff, 1838^{i c g}
- Ischyromerus Labram & Imhoff, 1838^{i c g}
- Isoceocephalus Kleine, 1920^{i c g}
- Ithystenomorphus Kleine, 1919^{i c g}
- Ithystenus Pascoe, 1862^{i c g}
- Kolbrentus Alonso-Zarazaga, Lyal, Bartolozzi & Sforzi, 1999-27^{i c g}
- Lasiorhynchus Lacordaire, 1865-12^{i c g}
- Leptocymatium Kleine, 1922^{i c g}
- Leptomiolispa Kleine, 1933^{i c g}
- Mesetia Blackburn, 1896^{i c g}
- Metatrachelus Kleine, 1925^{i c g}
- Microtrachelizus Senna, 1893^{i c g}
- Miolispa Pascoe, 1862^{i c g}
- Miolispoides Senna, 1894^{i c g}
- Neacratus Alonso-Zarazaga, Lyal, Bartolozzi & Sforzi, 1999^{i c g}
- Nemobrenthus Sharp, 1895^{i c g}
- Nemocephalinus Kleine, 1927^{i c g}
- Nemocephalus Guérin-Méneville, 1827^{i c g}
- Nemocoryna Sharp, 1895^{i c g}
- Neomygaleicus De Muizon, 1960^{i c g}
- Nothogaster Lacordaire, 1865-12^{i c g}
- Oxyscapanus Damoiseau, 1989^{i c g}
- Ozodecerus Chevrolat, 1839^{i c g}
- Palaeoceocephalus Kleine, 1920^{i c g}
- Parapisthius Kleine, 1935^{i c g}
- Paratrachelizus Kleine, 1921^{i c g b}
- Paryphobrenthus Kolbe, 1897^{i c g}
- Peraprophthalmus Kleine, 1923^{i c g}
- Periceocephalus Kleine, 1922^{i c g}
- Peritrachelizus Kleine, 1922^{i c g}
- Perroudia Damoiseau, 1962^{i c g}
- Phacecerus Schoenherr, 1840^{i c g}
- Phocylides Pascoe, 1872^{i c g}
- Piazocnemis Lacordaire, 1865-12^{i c g}
- Pithoderes Calabresi, 1920^{i c g}
- Plesiophocylides Kleine, 1925^{i c g}
- Prodector Pascoe, 1862^{i c g}
- Proephebocerus Calabresi, 1920^{i c g}
- Proteramocerus Kleine, 1921^{i c g}
- Pseudoceocephalus Kleine, 1920^{i c g}
- Pseudohigonius Damoiseau, 1987^{i c g}
- Pseudomygaleicus De Muizon, 1960^{i c g}
- Pseudophocylides Kleine, 1920^{i c g}
- Pterygostomus Lacordaire, 1865-12^{i c g}
- Pyresthema Kleine, 1922^{i c g}
- Rhinopteryx Lacordaire, 1865-12^{i c g}
- Schizephebocerus Kleine, 1923^{i c g}
- Schizotrachelus Lacordaire, 1865-12^{i c g}
- Schizuropterus Kleine, 1925^{i c g}
- Sclerotrachelus Kleine, 1921^{i c g}
- Sennaiella Alonso-Zarazaga, Lyal, Bartolozzi & Sforzi, 1999-27^{i c g}
- Stenobrentus Damoiseau, 1966-01^{i c g}
- Storeosomus Lacordaire, 1865-12^{i c g}
- Stroggylosternum Kleine, 1922^{i c g}
- Syggenithystenus Kleine, 1919^{i c g}
- Temnolaimus Chevrolat, 1839^{i c g}
- Teramocerus Schoenherr, 1840^{i c g}
- Thaumastopsis Kleine, 1921^{i c g}
- Thoracobrenthus Damoiseau, 1961^{i c g}
- Tracheloschizus Damoiseau, 1966^{i c g}
- Tulotus Senna, 1894^{i c g}
- Uroptera Berthold, 1827^{i c g}
- Uropteroides Kleine, 1922^{i c g}
- Vasseletia Sharp, 1895^{i c g}
- Zetophloeus Lacordaire, 1865-12^{i c g}

Data sources: i = ITIS, c = Catalogue of Life, g = GBIF, b = Bugguide.net
