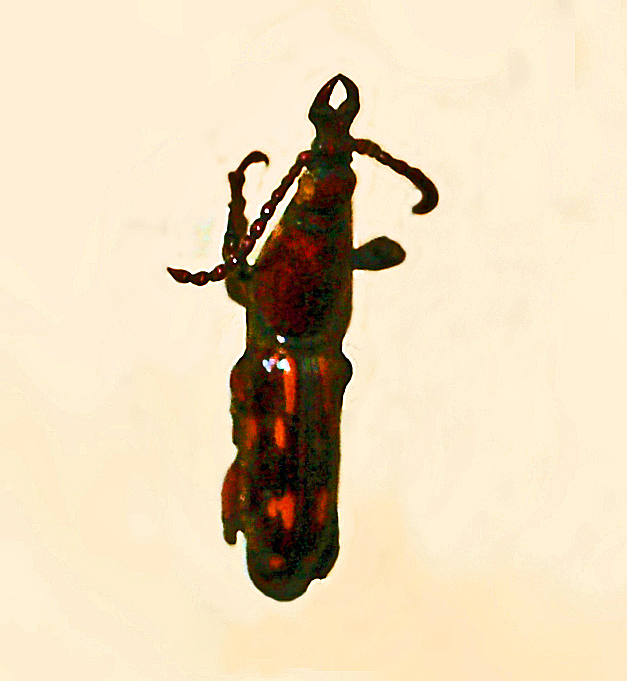
- Schizoeupsalis promissa from New Guinea

Scientific classification
- Kingdom: Animalia
- Phylum: Arthropoda
- Class: Insecta
- Order: Coleoptera
- Suborder: Polyphaga
- Infraorder: Cucujiformia
- Family: Brentidae
- Subfamily: Brentinae
- Tribe: Brentini
- Genus: Schizoeupsalis; Kleine, 1917
- Species: S. promissa

Binomial name
- Schizoeupsalis promissa Pascoe, 1872

Synonyms
- Eupsalis promissa, Pascoe, 1872; Eupsalis promissus, Pascoe, 1872; Orphilaia promissa (Pascoe)

= Schizoeupsalis =

Species of beetle

Schizoeupsalis promissa is a species of weevil in the Brentidae family. It is the only species in the genus Schizoeupsalis. It can be found in New Guinea and neighbouring islands. Beetles of this species present great individual variation.
