= Cordus =

Cordus may mean:

- Aulus Cremutius Cordus, Roman historian
- Euricius Cordus (1486-1535), German intellectual
- Valerius Cordus (1515-1544), German naturalist, son of Euricius
- Quintus Naevius Cordus Sutorius Macro, Roman prefect
- Cordus (beetle), a genus of weevils in the family Brentinae

== See also ==
- Cordia
