= Heterobrenthus texanus =

Scientific classification
- Domain: Eukaryota
- Kingdom: Animalia
- Phylum: Arthropoda
- Class: Insecta
- Order: Coleoptera
- Suborder: Polyphaga
- Infraorder: Cucujiformia
- Family: Brentidae
- Genus: Heterobrenthus
- Species: H. texanus

Binomial name
- Heterobrenthus texanus Schaeffer, 1915

Species of beetle

Heterobrenthus texanus is a species of primitive weevil in the beetle family Brentidae. It is found in North America.
