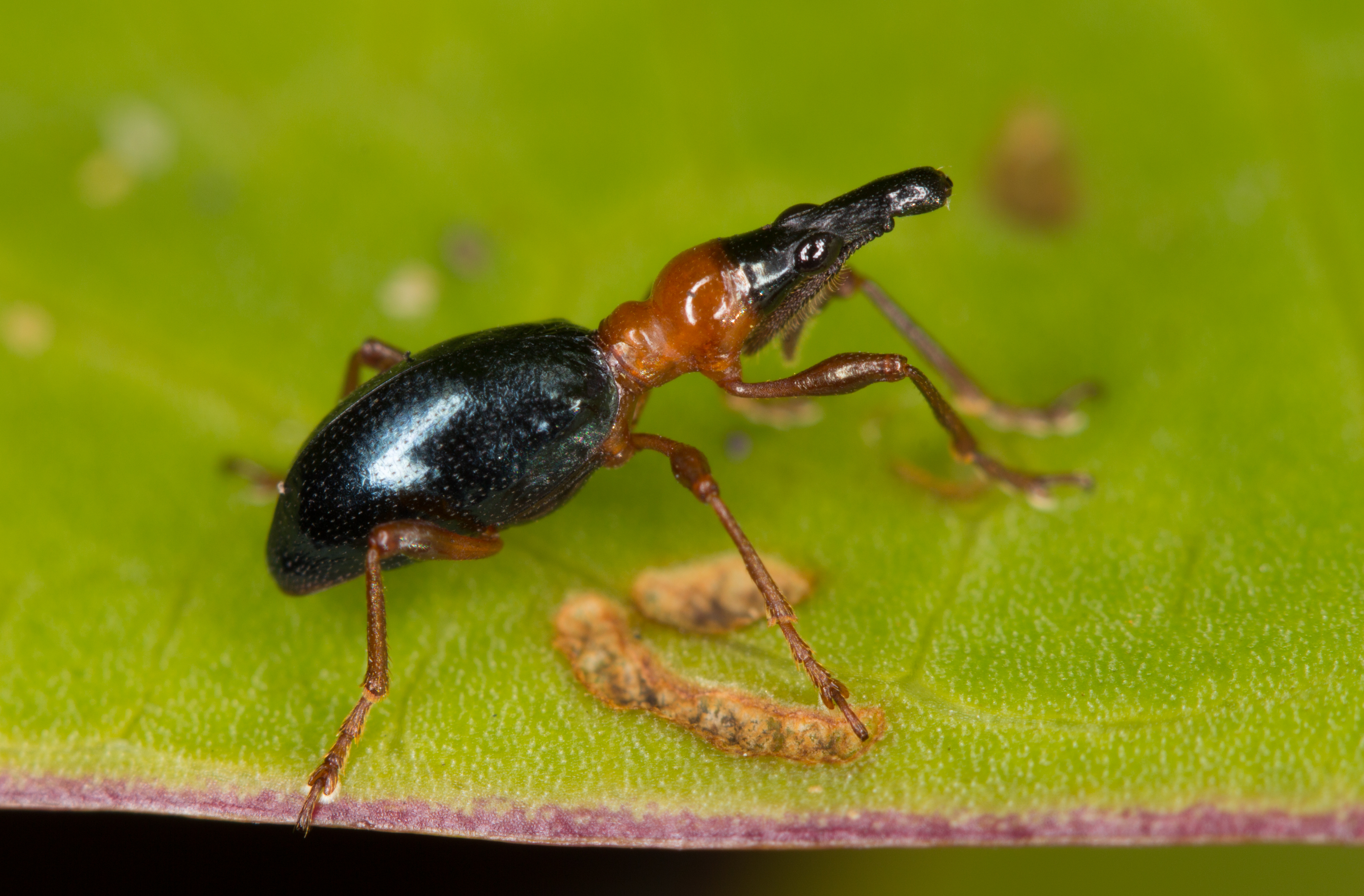

Scientific classification
- Kingdom: Animalia
- Phylum: Arthropoda
- Clade: Pancrustacea
- Class: Insecta
- Order: Coleoptera
- Suborder: Polyphaga
- Infraorder: Cucujiformia
- Superfamily: Curculionoidea
- Family: Brentidae
- Genus: Cylas
- Species: C. formicarius

Binomial name
- Cylas formicarius (Fabricius, 1798)

Synonyms
- Attelabus formicarius Fabricius, 1798; Brentus formicarius Fabricius, 1798; Cylas turcipennis Boheman, 1833

= Cylas formicarius =

Species of beetle

Cylas formicarius, the sweet potato weevil, is a species of sweet potato weevil in the beetle family Brentidae. It is found in Africa, Australia, the Caribbean, Europe, Northern Asia (excluding China), Central America, North America, Oceania, South America, Southern Asia, the Pacific Ocean, and temperate Asia.

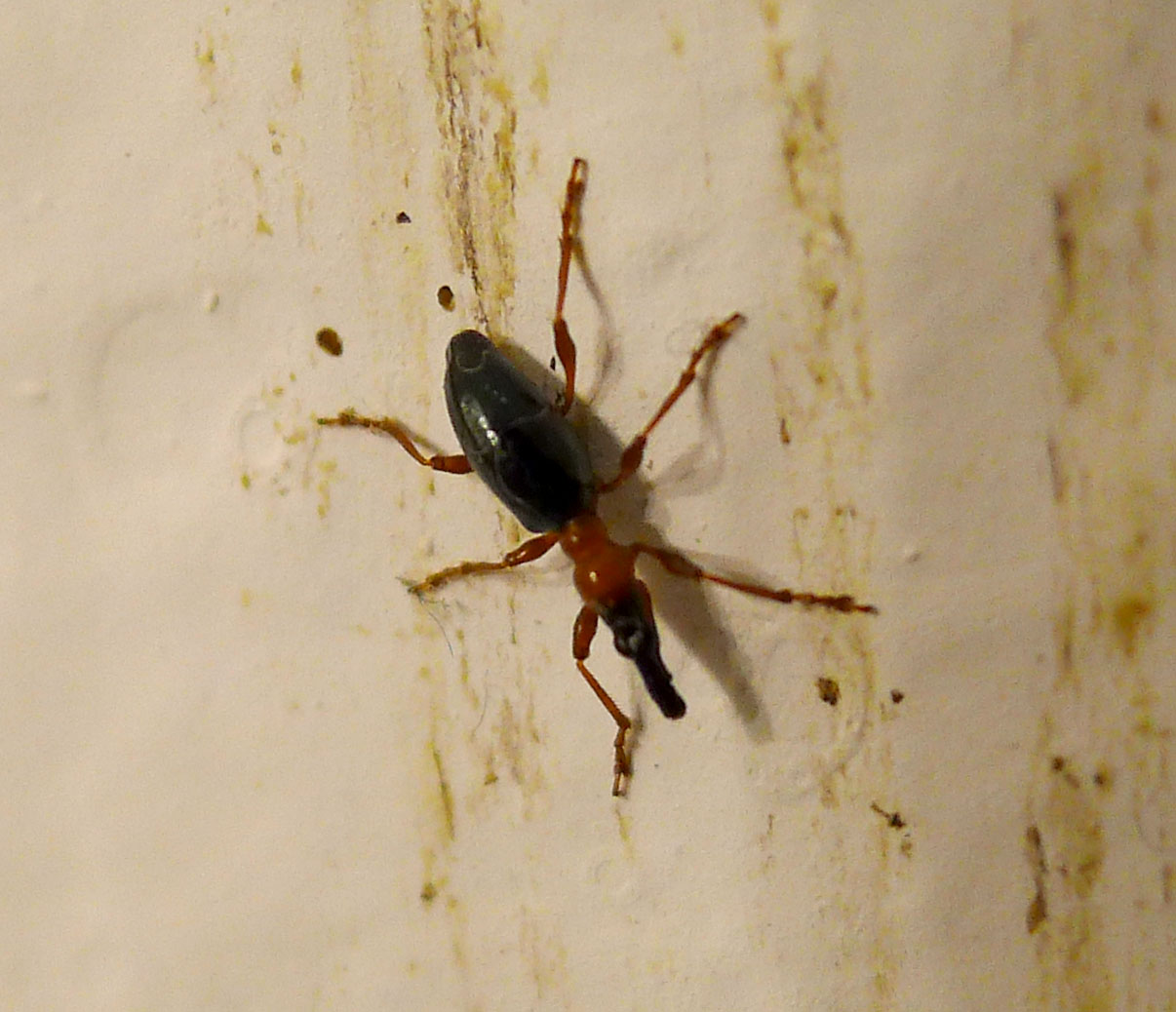
Sweet potato weevil, Cylas formicarius
