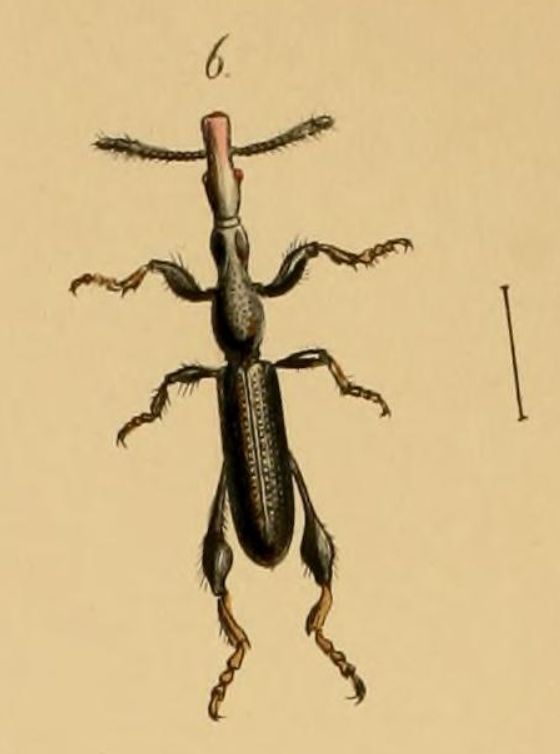
- Illustration of Taphroderes whitii, 1848

Scientific classification
- Domain: Eukaryota
- Kingdom: Animalia
- Phylum: Arthropoda
- Class: Insecta
- Order: Coleoptera
- Suborder: Polyphaga
- Infraorder: Cucujiformia
- Family: Brentidae
- Subfamily: Brentinae
- Tribe: Taphroderini
- Genus: Taphroderes; Schoenherr, 1823

Synonyms
- Abactrus Sharp, 1895

= Taphroderes =

Genus of beetles

Taphroderes is a genus of weevils from the Americas. Taphroderes belongs to the subfamily Brentinae and typical of tribe Taphroderini.

== Cladogram ==
- Taphroderes
  - Taphroderes bolivianus Scivittaro, 1975
  - Taphroderes championi (Sharp, 1895)
  - Taphroderes dimidiatus Scivittaro, 1975
  - Taphroderes foveatus (Lund, 1800)
  - Taphroderes kissingeri (Sleeper, 1960)
  - Taphroderes monnei Scivittaro, 1975
  - Taphroderes nevermanni Kleine, 1927
  - Taphroderes sahlbergi (Sharp, 1895)
  - Taphroderes venezuelanus Scivittaro, 1975

:
