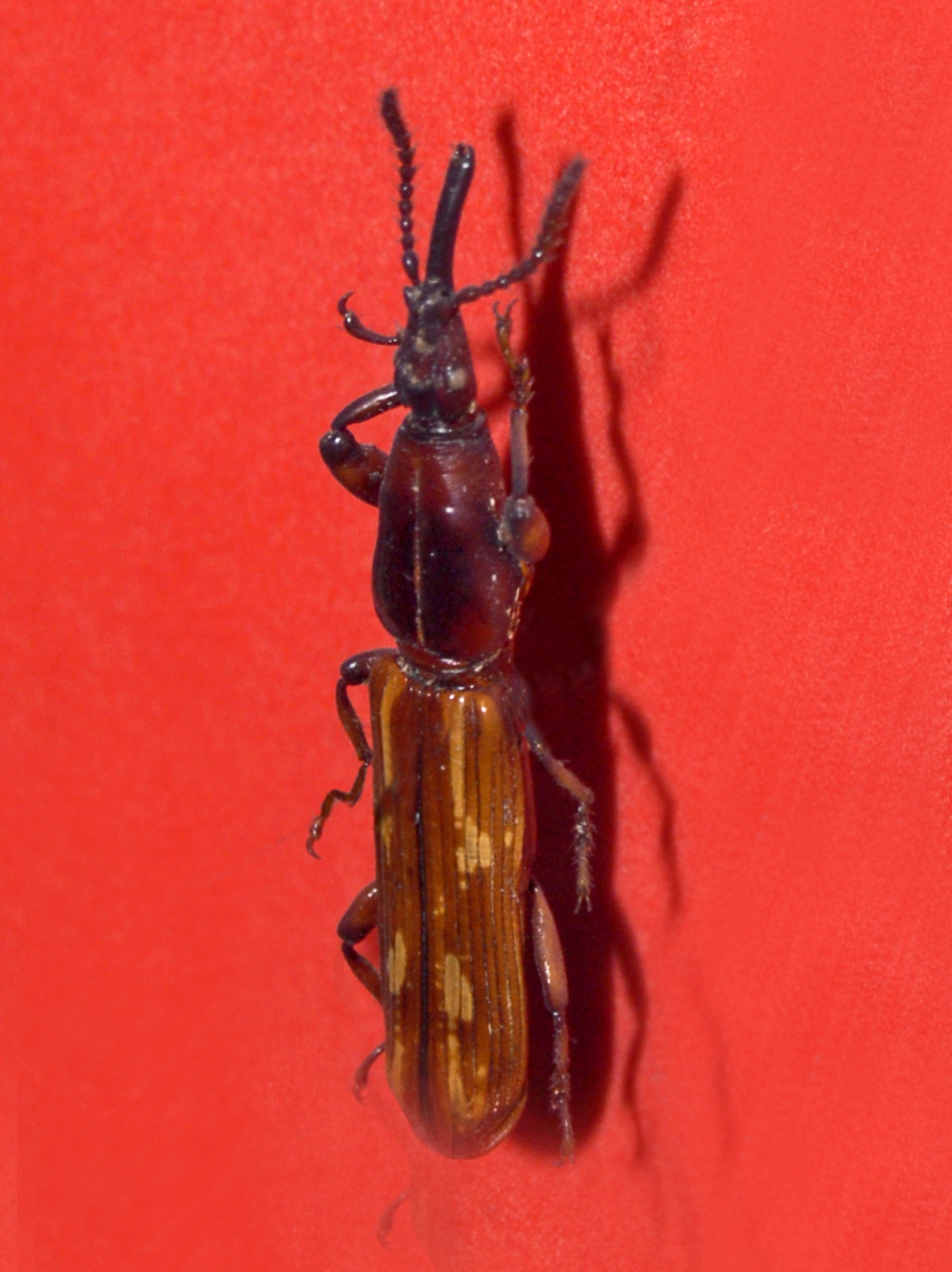
- Museum specimen

Scientific classification
- Kingdom: Animalia
- Phylum: Arthropoda
- Clade: Pancrustacea
- Class: Insecta
- Order: Coleoptera
- Suborder: Polyphaga
- Infraorder: Cucujiformia
- Superfamily: Curculionoidea
- Family: Brentidae
- Subfamily: Brentinae
- Tribe: Brentini
- Genus: Cephalobarus; Schoenherr, 1840
- Species: C. macrocephalus

Binomial name
- Cephalobarus macrocephalus Boheman, 1840

Synonyms
- List (Genus): Brachycephalobarus Kleine, 1914; (Species): Brachycephalobarus enderleini Kleine, 1914; Cephalobarus macrocephalus subsp. flavoornatus Senna, 1889; Cephalobarus macrocephalus subsp. maculatus Senna, 1889

= Cephalobarus =

Cephalobarus macrocephalus

Genus of beetles

Cephalobarus is a genus of straight-snouted weevils belonging to the family Brentidae. It is monotypic, being represented by the single species Cephalobarus macrocephalus. This species is found in South America.
