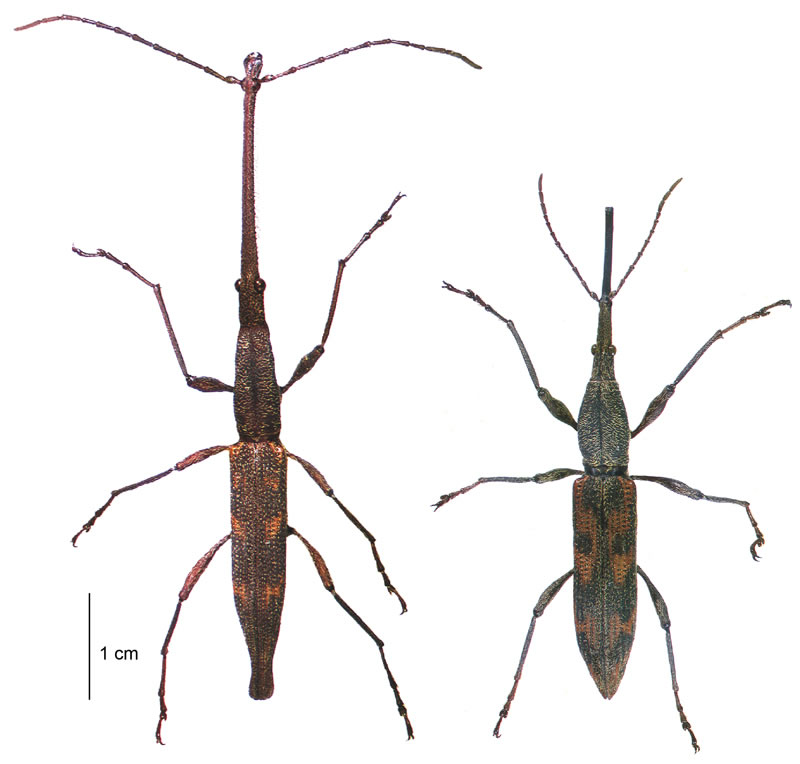
- Male (left) and female (right)

Scientific classification
- Kingdom: Animalia
- Phylum: Arthropoda
- Clade: Pancrustacea
- Class: Insecta
- Order: Coleoptera
- Suborder: Polyphaga
- Infraorder: Cucujiformia
- Superfamily: Curculionoidea
- Family: Brentidae
- Genus: Lasiorhynchus
- Species: L. barbicornis

Binomial name
- Lasiorhynchus barbicornis (Fabricius, 1775)

= New Zealand giraffe weevil =

Lasiorhynchus barbicornis

Species of beetle

The New Zealand giraffe weevil, Lasiorhynchus barbicornis, is a straight-snouted weevil in the subfamily Brentinae, endemic to New Zealand. L. barbicornis is New Zealand's longest beetle, and shows extreme sexual dimorphism: males measure up to 90mm, and females 50mm, although there is an extreme range of body sizes in both sexes. In males, the elongated snout (or rostrum) can be nearly as long as the body. Male giraffe weevils use this long rostrum to battle over females, although small males can avoid conflict and 'sneak' in to mate with females, sometimes under the noses of large males. The larval weevils tunnel into wood for at least two years before emerging, and live for only a few weeks as adults.

== Distribution and habitat ==
Giraffe weevils are common in the North Island. Although rarer, they can also be found in the northwestern South Island, as far south as Greymouth. One has been recorded from the Hollyford Valley in Fiordland. Mitochondrial DNA suggests that during the Pleistocene ice ages giraffe weevils were only found in the remnant forests of Northland, and have expanded southward during this current interglacial.

== Taxonomy ==
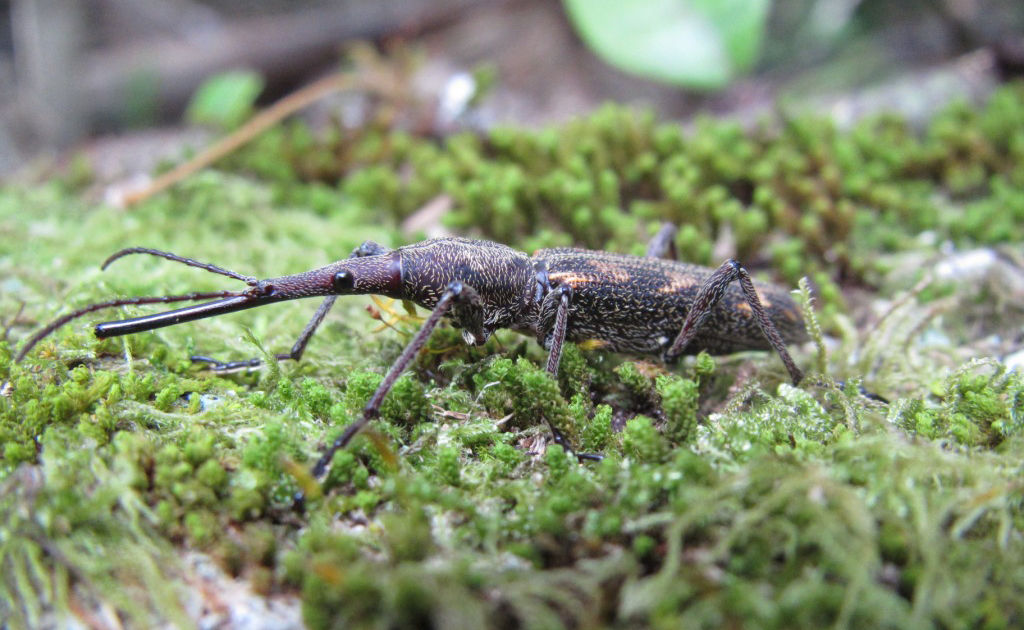
Female New Zealand giraffe weevil

This species was described by the Danish entomologist Johan Christian Fabricius in 1775, from specimens collected by Joseph Banks in 1769 on Cook's first voyage to New Zealand, presumably from Ship Cove in Queen Charlotte Sound. Fabricius described the smaller females as a different species, Curculio assimilis, but suspected they were the males of what he named Curculio barbicornis (later moved to its own genus, Lasiorhynchus). His specimens are now in the Banks Collection of the Natural History Museum, London, and the Fabricius Collection in the Natural History Museum of Denmark.

L. barbicornis is occasionally accused of not being a weevil at all, but in fact, it is in the family Brentidae, the straight-snouted weevils, as opposed to the much larger family Curculionidae or "true" weevils; brentids lack the distinctive geniculate (elbowed) antennae that characterise curculionid weevils. These and several other families are part of the superfamily of all weevils, Curculionoidea. L. barbicornis is the only member of the Brentinae (a tropical subfamily) in New Zealand, and its closest relatives are in Sulawesi, Australia, Vanuatu, and Fiji. It is the only member of the genus Lasiorhynchus.

== Etymology ==
Lasiorhynchus means "densely hairy rostrum"; barbicornis ("bearded horn") refers to the dense black backward-directed beard underneath the male's rostrum, or possibly to its hairy antennae. The beetle's Māori names include pepeke nguturoa ("long-beaked beetle": ngutu roa is another name for kiwi), tūwhaipapa, and tūwhaitara, the latter two after the Māori god of newly made canoes, because its canoe-like body and upturned rostrum resemble a waka and prow.

== Description ==
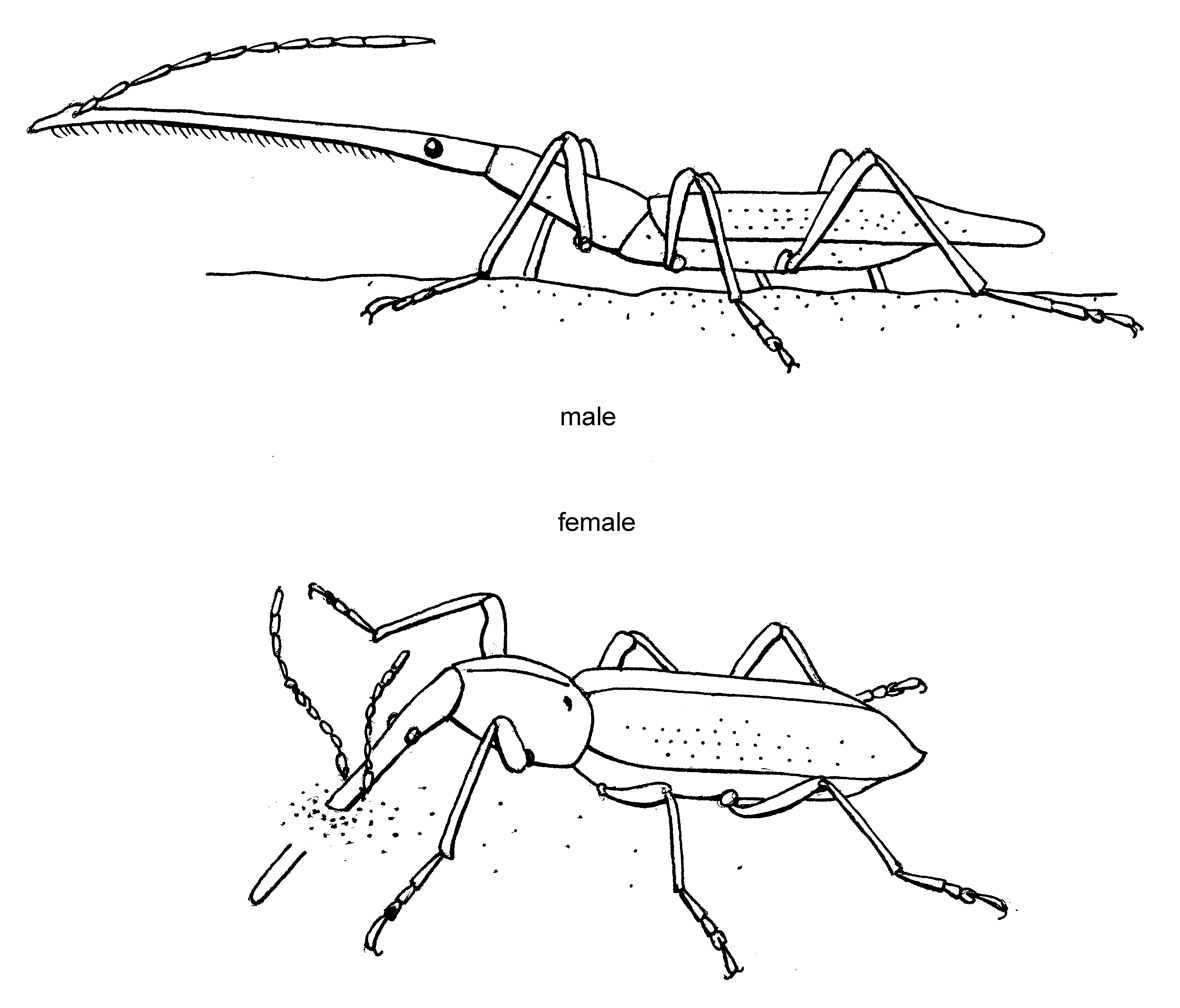
Male and female L. barbicornis, showing how the placement of antennae is determined by the female's need to drill into wood. Illustration by Des Helmore.

Giraffe weevils have a distinctive elongated head, and reddish-brown markings on their elytra. They are the only weevils in the world with a visible scutellum.

They are New Zealand's longest native beetle, and the longest brentid weevil in the world. They vary enormously in size, from 15 to 90 mm total length in males and 12 to 50 mm in females. This wide variation in body size, particularly in the length of the male rostrum, may be in response to changing environmental conditions from year to year. Body size increases the further south the weevils live, but male rostra get proportionately less long with increasing latitude.

These weevils display extreme sexual dimorphism; males have an elongated rostrum or snout with antennae at the tip, which they use as a weapon for fighting over females. The female giraffe weevil has a shorter rostrum with antennae about halfway along, which allows her to bite egg-laying holes in tree trunks without damaging her antennae.

Giraffe weevils are mostly active by day, sheltering in the canopy at night, and feed on sap. When suddenly disturbed, they will drop backwards off a tree trunk and lie in the leaf litter, playing dead, for up to an hour.

== Life cycle ==
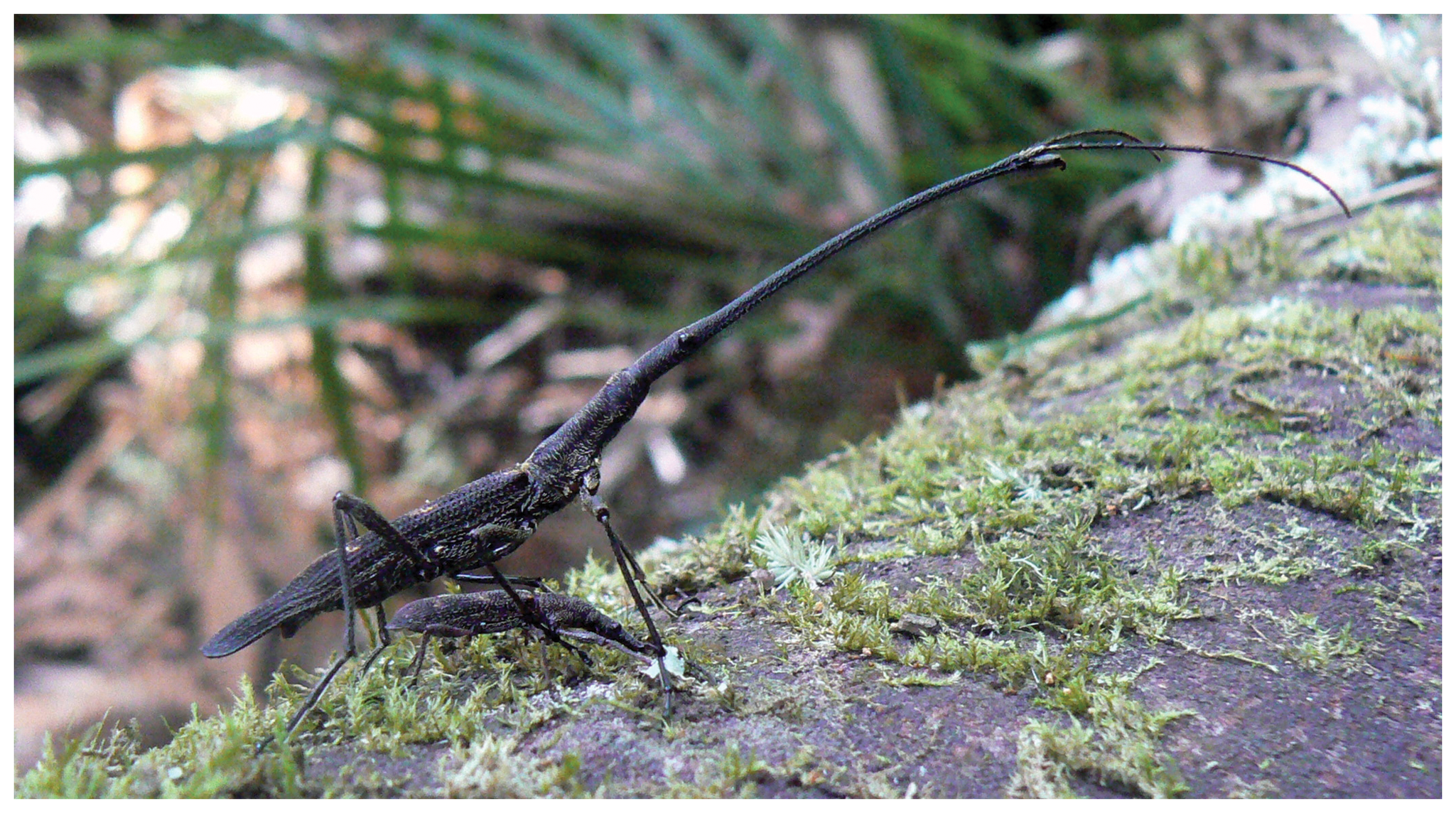
A large male L. barbicornis guards a female drilling an egg-laying hole, demonstrating the extreme sexual dimorphism in this species.

The life cycle of Lasiorhynchus barbicornis starts when a female lays a single egg about 3–4 mm deep into a tree. Female L. barbicornis select from a wide variety of trees when choosing where to lay their eggs. Some of these tree species include kauri (Agathis australis), lacebark (Hoheria spp.), pigeonwood (Hedycarya arborea), rewarewa (Knightia excelsa), rimu (Dacrydium cupressinum), karaka (Corynocarpus laevigatus), tawa (Beilschmiedia tawa), and pukatea (Laurelia novae-zelandiae). This process takes place during the months of October through March.

The larvae of L. barbicornis burrow into the wood of a tree for up to two years. The larvae do not eat wood but rather feed on the fungus that grows on dead trees. Then L. barbicornis exit the bark of the tree as a fully formed adult beetle. These adult L. barbicornis exit from trees in the spring and summer. After emerging from the tree, L. barbicornis only live for a few weeks. Eggs are laid on dying wood from October to March. The female bores a narrow hole with her mandibles into the trunk, pulling her head out every half-millimeter to clear away sawdust.

L. barbicornis larvae live at least two years. Dissections of larvae show they feed on fungus growing in the larval tunnels, not the wood itself. During the pupal stage, the weevil's rostrum is doubled underneath the body, but it straightens when the adult beetle emerges and eats its way out of the tree, leaving a square tunnel. Sometimes the tunnel is too narrow, and the adults perish with their rostrum protruding. Adults emerge between October and March; their peak abundance is in February. The sex ratio is about 60:40 males:females. Adult giraffe weevils generally only live for a few weeks, although one male was recorded as living at least 29 days.

== Mating ==
Mating in Lasiorhynchus barbicornis takes place above the ground on the bark of a tree. Mating involves a female who carves a hole into the bark of a tree. This hole is usually about 0.5 mm wide and 3 – 4 mm deep. The holes are usually at a 45º angle into the bark of the tree. The female has a specialized rostrum and mandibles which allow her to collect debris while drilling into the bark and push it out from the tree. While the female is burrowing into the bark, the male begins to copulate with the female. This copulation precedes oviposition. After copulation, the male disengages and the female turns around, laying in the hole that she drilled. While in the hole, she lays only one egg. She then fills the hole with sawdust and debris from the surrounding area to hide the egg. This process occurs within the span of about 30 minutes. Both female and male L. barbicornis are polygamous and generally tend to take many different mates. L. barbicornis form large aggregates on trees in order to mate. According to studies conducted by New Zealand entomologist Rebecca J. LeGrice, 65% of male L. barbicornis were able to mate several times in the span of just one hour. This percentage is greater for females on average. 77% of female L. barbicornis mated multiple times in the span of an hour.

Temperature also plays a role in the mating success of L. barbicornis. It has been found that in colder temperatures, male L. barbicornis are less able to copulate. Additionally, the longer the rostrum of an individual L. barbicornis, the faster the individual loses heat. However, the smaller an individual's body size, the quicker it loses heat compared to its larger bodied brethren. In colder temperatures, the L. barbicornis are less able to perform active movements that are required for mating and therefore carry out fewer matings and mate for shorter durations on average. This phenomenon is exhibited in male L. barbicornis in the colder region near Lake Papaitonga, New Zealand who display noticeably lower rates of copulation compared to other L. barbicornis who live in warmer areas.

External videos
- Males battle (Two males fight for access to a female, and one gets thrown from a tree)
- Sneaky male (A 'sneaking' male avoids being dislodged by a larger male)

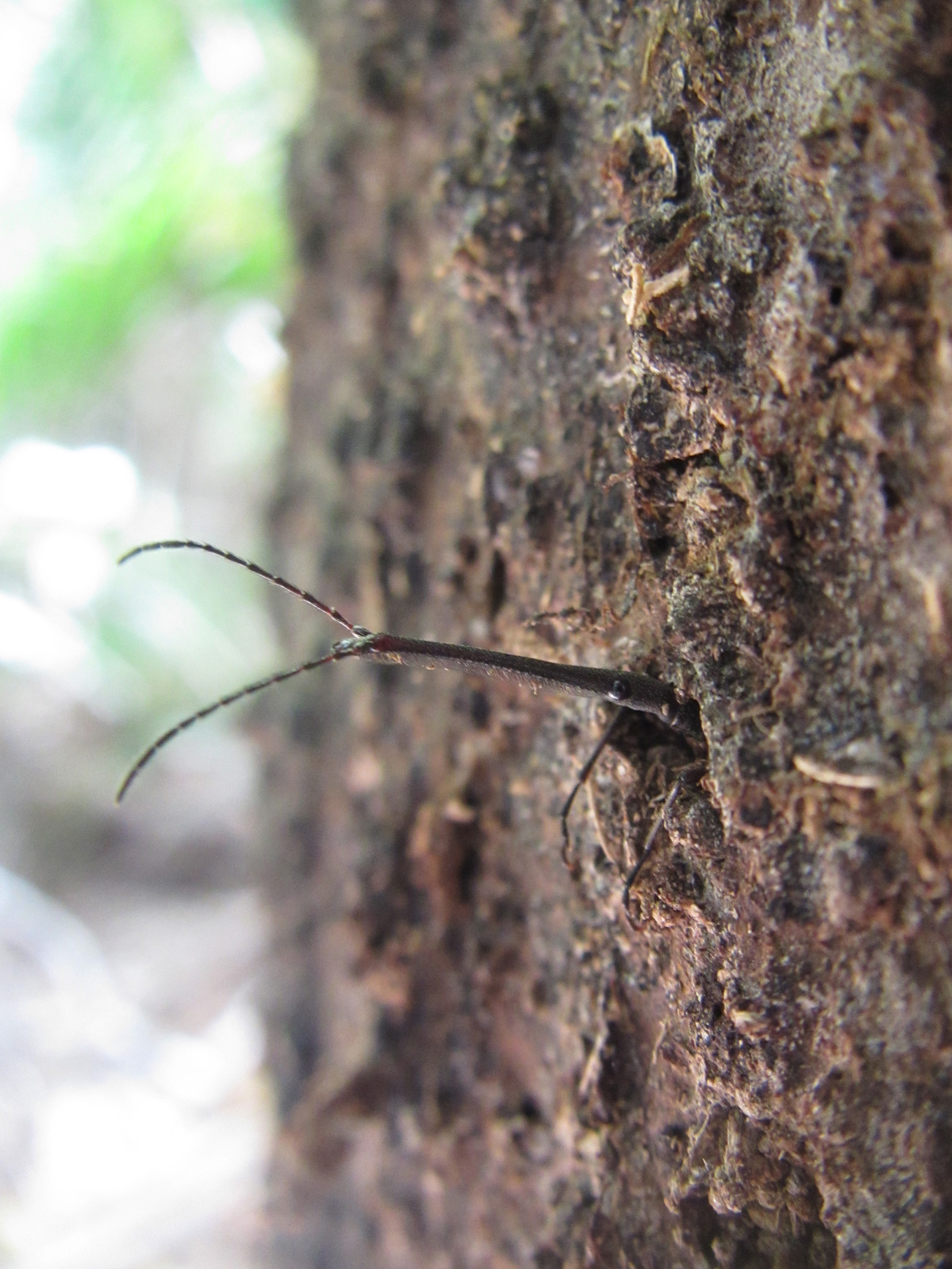
An adult male Lasiorhynchus barbicornis emerging from a tree

=== Mate choice ===
On average, it has been observed that male Lasiorhynchus barbicornis, when given the option, opt to mate with larger females. This phenomenon may indicate why there are fewer matings with smaller females. It has been found that body size of individual males does not influence their mating success. Generally, smaller male L. barbicornis are less able to succeed in fights compared to larger males. Additionally, smaller males tend to avoid fights with larger males and retreat more often when presented with conflicts over mating. However, smaller males are still able to copulate with females through a process known as 'sneaking' copulations. This 'sneaking' copulation technique is carried out when a small male L. barbicornis flattens himself underneath the female and mates while trying to avoid recognition from other larger males. Medium-sized L. barbicornis are often too small to joust with their rostrum, yet too large to engage in 'sneaking' copulations. Additionally, females have reduced mating success when there are more females in close proximity to each other, which challenges the idea that males are the ones involved in mating competition.

=== Mating aggression ===
Lasiorhynchus barbicornis males exhibit intense competition with each other in order to mate with females. Males have been known to battle on trees with their snouts until the other retreats or is knocked from the bark and falls from the tree. Fighting over mates often happens between male L. barbicornis when a single male comes into contact with an actively copulating pair of L. barbicornis. In this circumstance, males will use their mandibles which curve downward and their long rostra to rake across the pair in an attempt to separate the couple and disrupt mating. When this tactic is successful and the pair is separated, the male establishes a strong hold on the opponent male. The male who was dislodged exhibits immediate submission to the other male and allows himself to be lifted up off from the bark of the tree. The male is then flung from the bark and off the tree altogether. Many male L. barbicornis have missing legs, especially tibia or tarsa, which is often a result of male-male mating conflicts. Males who have been dominated and flung from the tree during copulation typically spend long segments of time hiding in holes, under loose flaps of tree bark, or in tree bark.

Males often engage in conflict over mating if they are around the same size and strength as their opponent. Mating conflicts among L. barbicornis are often won by males with larger rostra. 90% of mating conflicts are won by a male that is larger than their opponent. However, there is no evidence of sexual selection for male body size or rostrum length.

== Physiology ==
This species exhibits extreme sexual dimorphism. Males are much larger than females on average. However, males vary significantly in their size. The largest of the male Lasiorhynchus barbicornis are about thirty times larger than the smallest male. The snouts, called rostra, of male New Zealand giraffe weevils also grow proportionally to their body size. The largest male L. barbicornis can grow up to 90 mm long. L. barbicornis are the longest brentid weevil in the world. The rostrum length of L. barbicornis typically makes up at least 50% of their entire body length.

In many animals that have sexually selected weapon traits, which are body parts utilized in intrasexual conflicts, the energy and overall metabolic cost to use these appendages normally increase as the size of the organism increases. However, according to studies done by Dr. Ummat Somjee, researcher for the Smithsonian Tropical Research Institute, L. barbicornis do not follow this trend. In L. barbicornis, larger males have snouts and legs that have more cuticle and less metabolic active tissue than those in the smaller males. Additionally, larger individuals invest about 60% less metabolic active tissue and energy into their rostra compared to the smallest males. This is indicative of a special metabolic cost saving mechanism that is unique to the physiology of large male L. barbicornis.

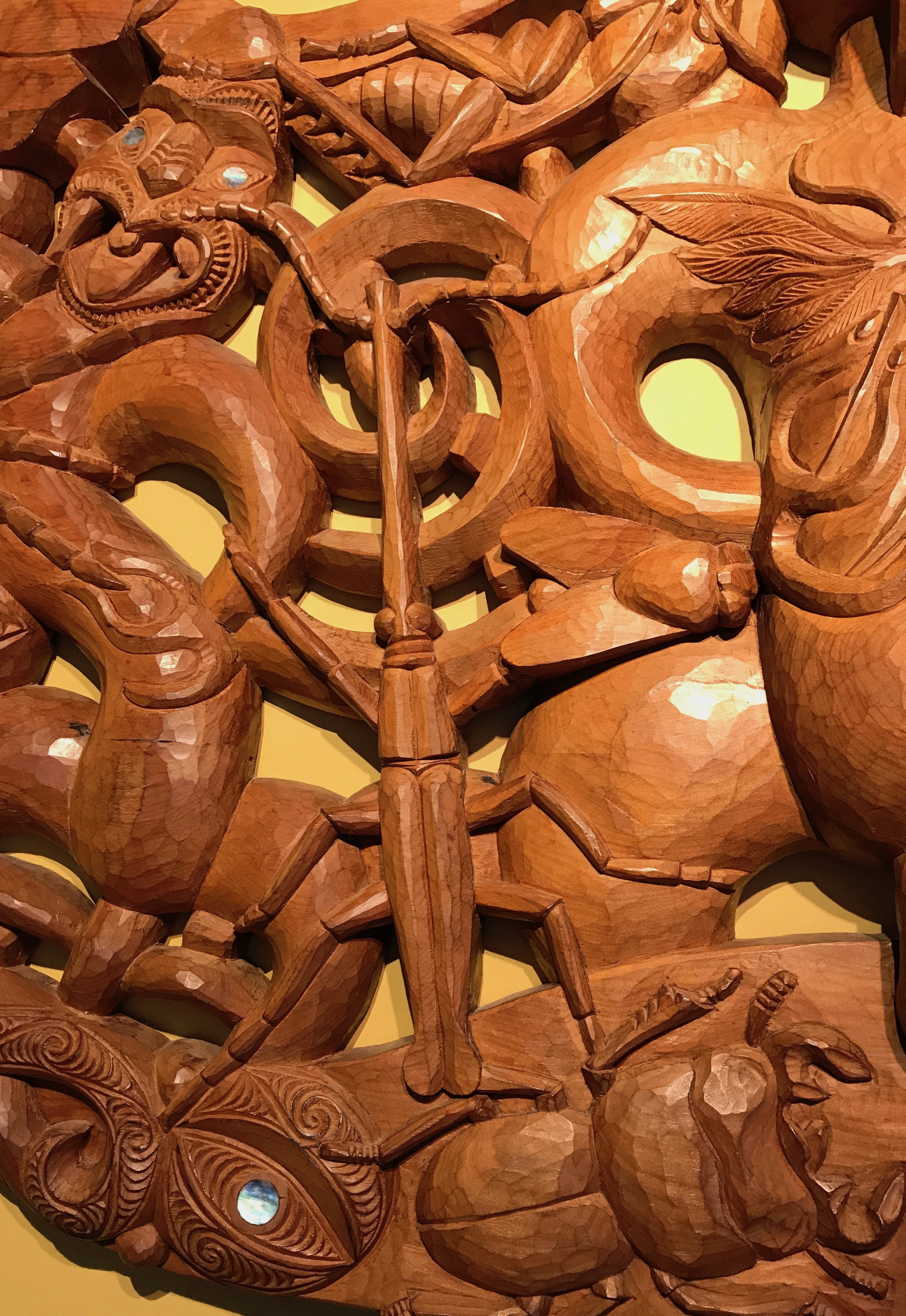
L. barbicornis on a lintel or pare carved by Denis Conway in 1990, on display at the New Zealand Arthropod Collection at Landcare Research, Auckland.

=== Flight ===
Lasiorhynchus barbicornis are able to fly despite their large body size. Although this species is mainly active during the day, and flies during the daytime from time to time, L. barbicornis mainly travel by flight at night. L. barbicornis launch themselves from the tree they are on if they become startled. They also will seek shelter in higher branches of the tree when hiding from potential danger. L. barbicornis exhibit slow, non-directional flight patterns and are often unable to avoid large objects. It is thought that increased investments in wing and leg length in male L. barbicornis compensates for their poor flying abilities. Larger male L. barbicornis with exaggerated rostra are less able to fly, but they are likely better suited for mating and success in conflicts with other male opponents over female mates. Not much is currently known about the flying abilities of female L. barbicornis and the potential relationship between flying capabilities and individual rostra and wing size.

== Genetic distribution ==
According to studies conducted by Dr. Christina J. Painting for the Biological Journal of the Linnean Society, Lasiorhynchus barbicornis likely had a restricted habitat range during the Pleistocene era which was followed by a glacial retreat. As a result, there are now several genetic populations of L. barbicornis. While L. barbicornis live throughout New Zealand, the population of L. barbicornis in northern New Zealand have more genetic variation than the populations of this species in southern New Zealand. After a glacial retreat it is hypothesized that the habitat range of L. barbicornis had expanded. The northern population of the L. barbicornis lives in the forests of the North Island of New Zealand. In contrast, the southern population lives in the more warm wet lowland forests of the western South Island.
