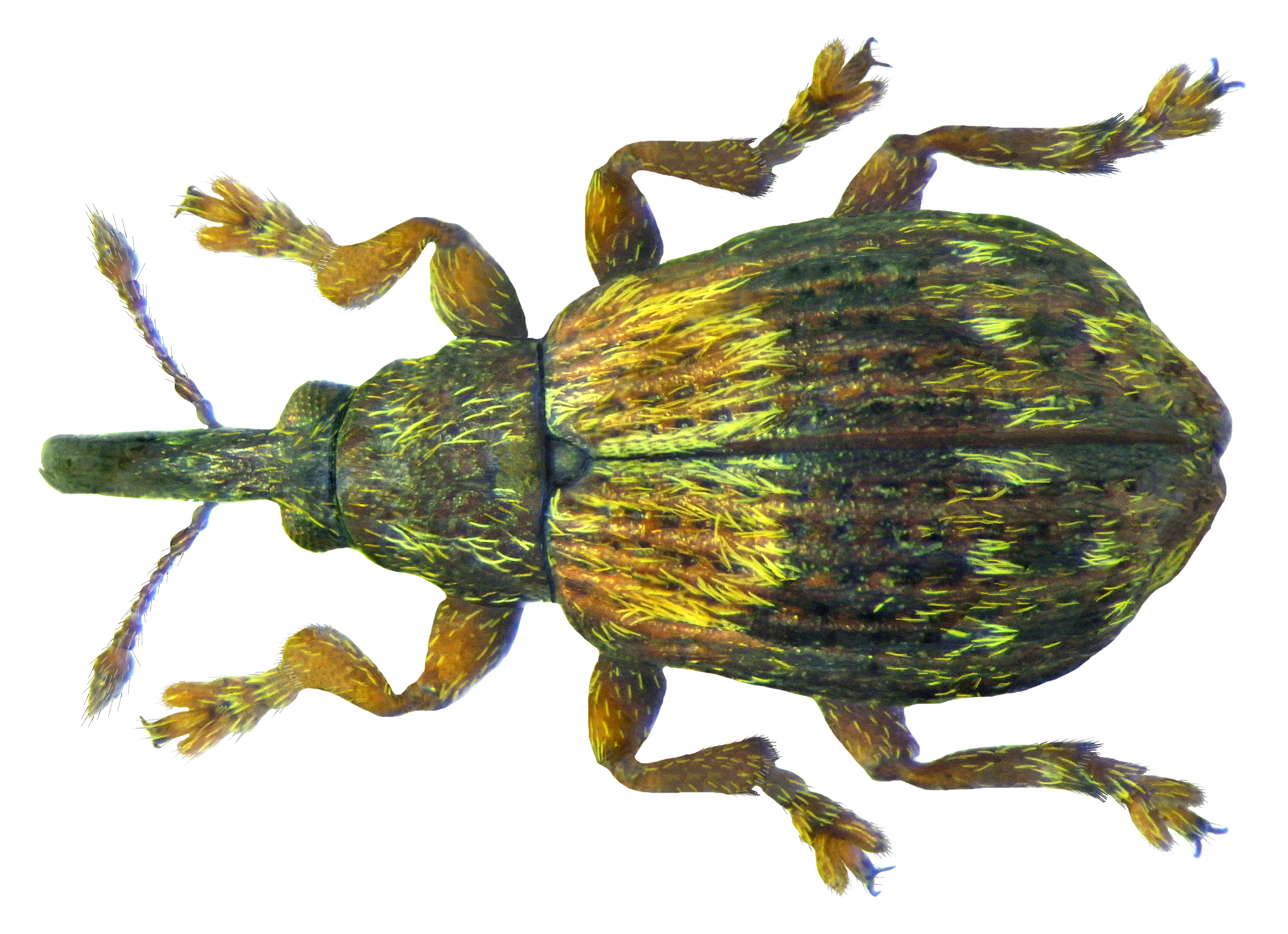

Scientific classification
- Kingdom: Animalia
- Phylum: Arthropoda
- Class: Insecta
- Order: Coleoptera
- Suborder: Polyphaga
- Infraorder: Cucujiformia
- Family: Brentidae
- Genus: Ixapion; Roudier & Tempère, 1973
- Species: I. variegatum

Binomial name
- Ixapion variegatum (Wencker, 1864)

= Ixapion =

Genus of beetles

Ixapion variegatum, the kiss me slow weevil, is a weevil in the family Brentidae, which occurs at low densities throughout its west European range. It is the only species in the genus Ixapion.

Its larval stages feed on mistletoe, from which its English vernacular name is derived. Eggs are laid in the plants stems, just below terminal buds. In Europe, the larvae feed from April–July, and emerge the following June.

Feeding by adult weevils, which are between 2.1 and 2.8 mm long, results in brown speckling on the plant's leaves.
