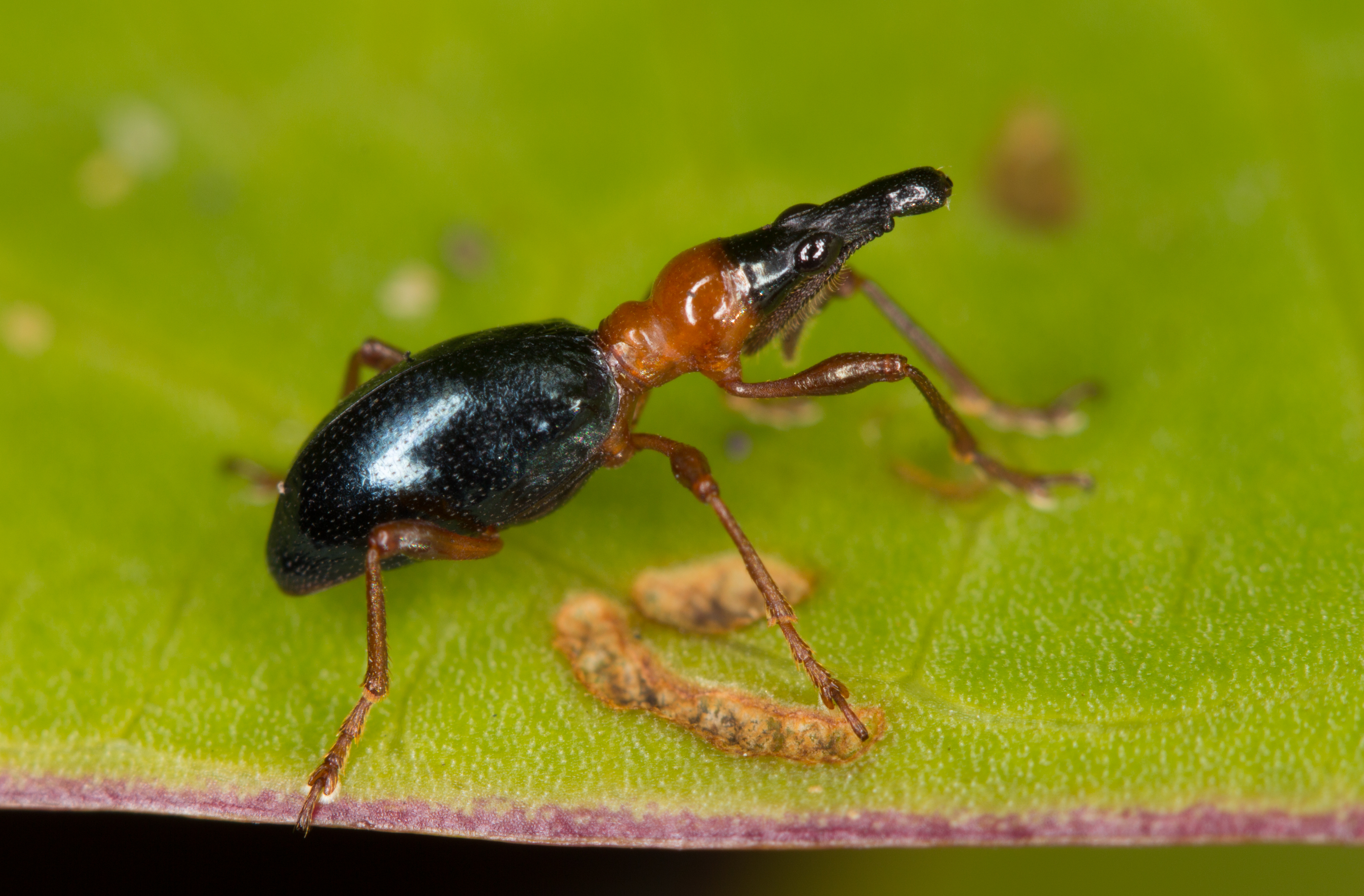
- Cylas formicarius

Scientific classification
- Domain: Eukaryota
- Kingdom: Animalia
- Phylum: Arthropoda
- Class: Insecta
- Order: Coleoptera
- Suborder: Polyphaga
- Infraorder: Cucujiformia
- Family: Brentidae
- Subfamily: Cyladinae; Schoenherr, 1823

= Cyladinae =

Subfamily of beetles

Cyladinae is a subfamily of sweet potato weevils in the family of beetles known as Brentidae. There are two genera in Cyladinae, Cylas Latreille 1802, and the extinct genus Miocenocylas Legalov 2018.

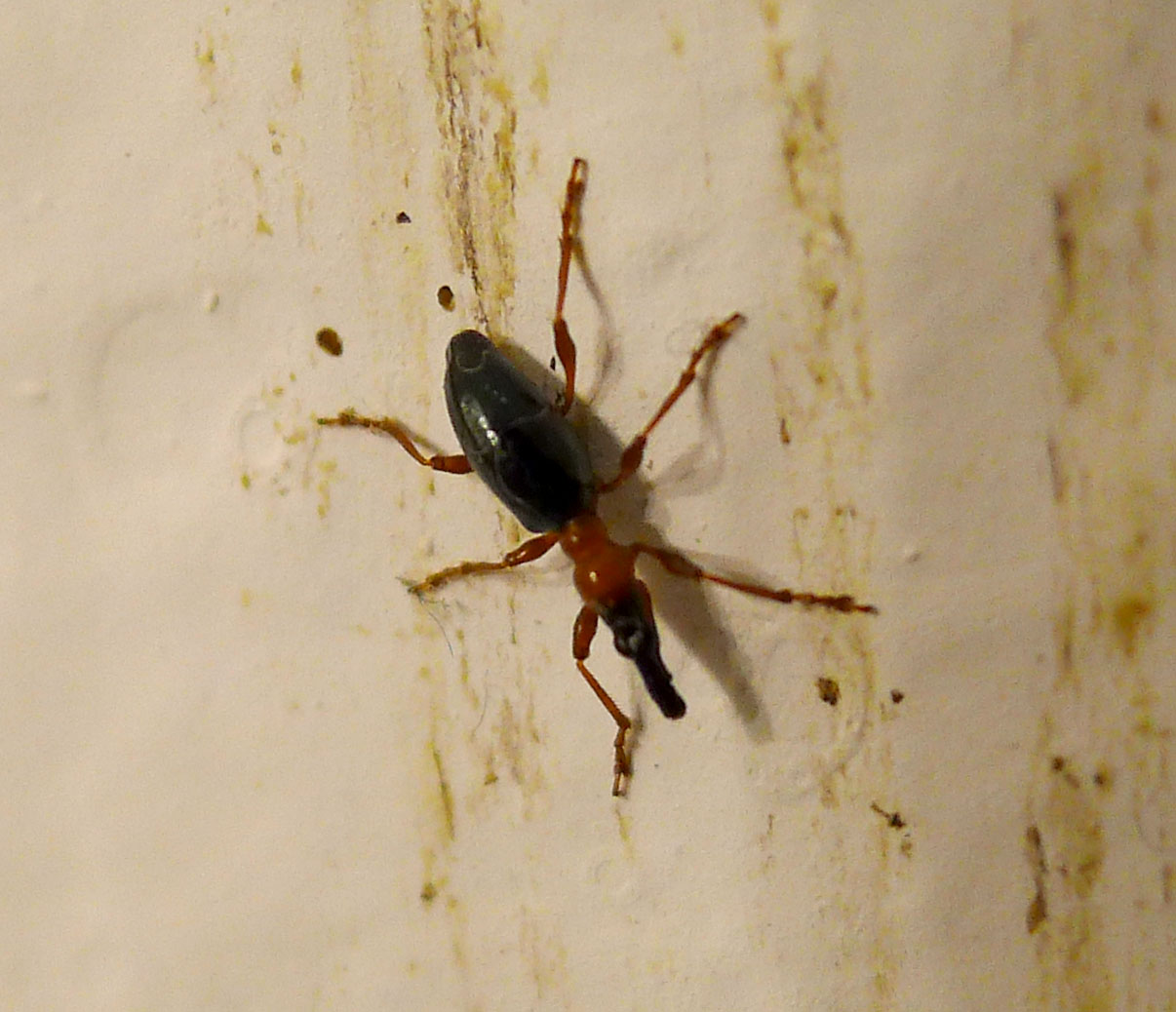
Cylas formicarius
