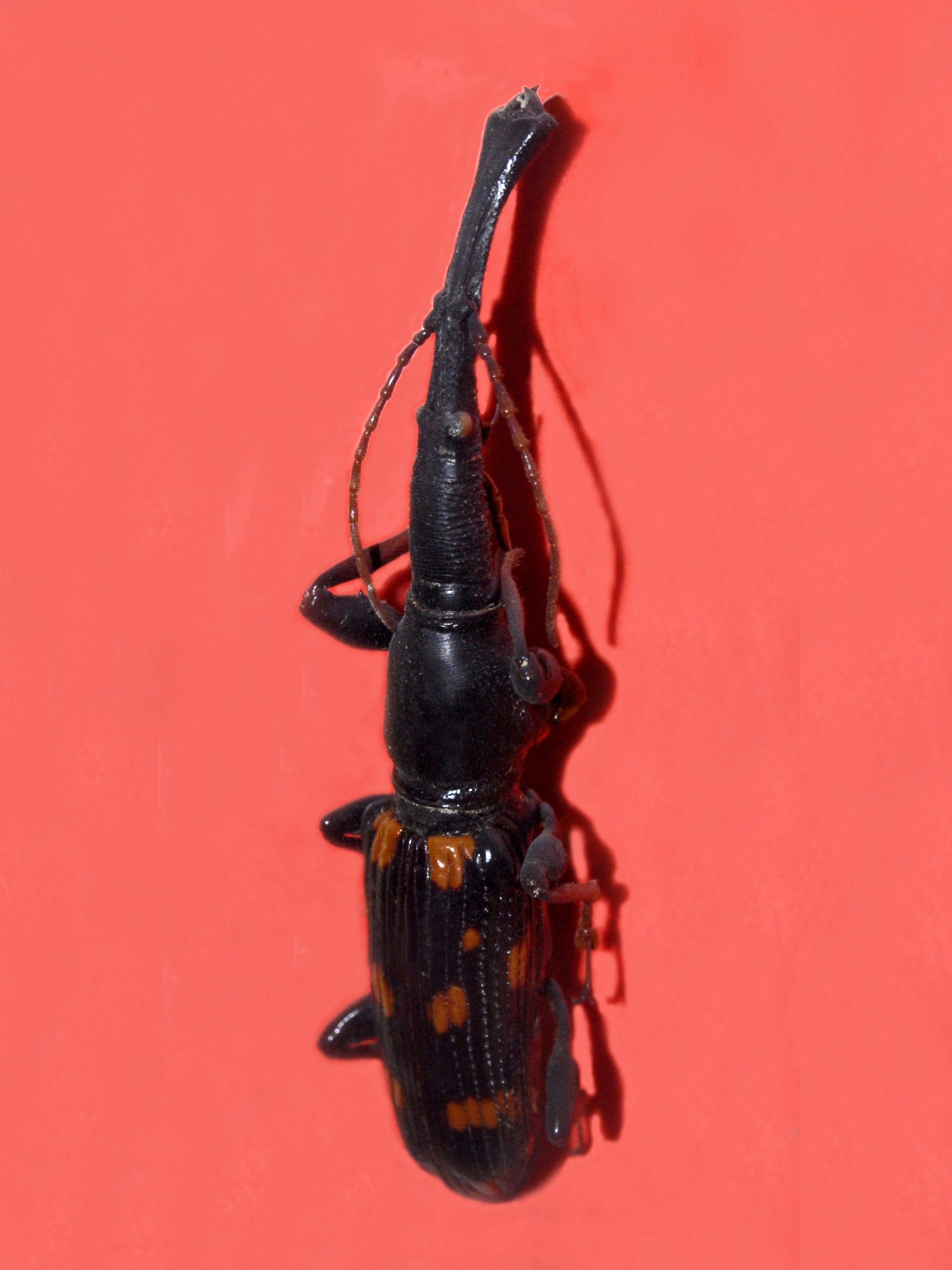
- Museum specimen of Eutrachelus temmincki

Scientific classification
- Domain: Eukaryota
- Kingdom: Animalia
- Phylum: Arthropoda
- Class: Insecta
- Order: Coleoptera
- Suborder: Polyphaga
- Infraorder: Cucujiformia
- Family: Brentidae
- Subfamily: Brentinae
- Tribe: Brentini
- Genus: Eutrachelus; Berthold, 1827

Synonyms
- List: Entrachelus Berthold, 1827; Eutrachela Chevrolat, 1839; Eutrachele Latreille, 1825; Eutracheles Latreille, 1828

= Eutrachelus =

Genus of beetles

Eutrachelus is a genus of straight-snouted weevils belonging to the family Brentidae.

== Species ==
The following two species are recognised in the genus Eutrachelus:

- Eutrachelus morio Kleine, 1936
- Eutrachelus temmincki (Latreille, 1825)
