= Slonik =

† Slonik sibiricus

Scientific classification
- Kingdom: Animalia
- Phylum: Arthropoda
- Class: Insecta
- Order: Coleoptera
- Suborder: Polyphaga
- Infraorder: Cucujiformia
- Family: Brentidae
- Genus: †Slonik; Zherichin, 1977
- Species: †S. sibiricus

Binomial name
- †Slonik sibiricus Zherichin, 1977

Genus of beetles

Slonik is an extinct genus of weevils in the family Brentidae. It is monotypic, being represented by the single species Slonik sibiricus.
