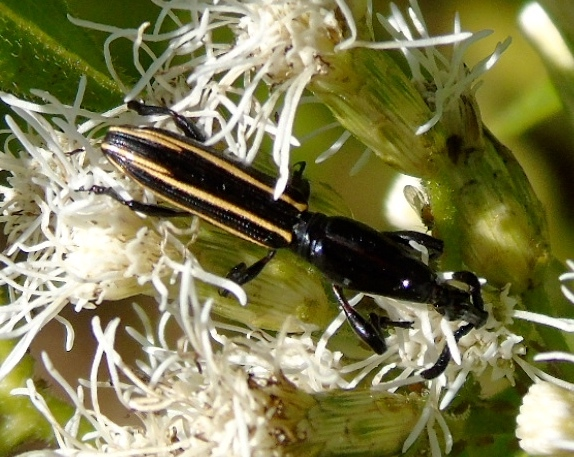
- Brentus anchorago

Scientific classification
- Domain: Eukaryota
- Kingdom: Animalia
- Phylum: Arthropoda
- Class: Insecta
- Order: Coleoptera
- Suborder: Polyphaga
- Infraorder: Cucujiformia
- Family: Brentidae
- Subfamily: Brentinae
- Tribe: Brentini
- Genus: Brentus; Fabricius, 1787

Synonyms
- Anchorifera Voet, 1806; Brenthus Fabricius, 1787; Brentis Zherikhin & Gratshev, 1995; Nabraenthus Kleine, 1929

= Brentus =

Genus of beetles

Brentus is the type genus of beetles belonging to the family Brentidae and tribe Brentini; species are found in the Americas.

== Species ==
The Global Biodiversity Information Facility lists:

1. Brentus anchorago (Linnaeus, 1758)
2. Brentus approximatus Erichson, 1847
3. Brentus armiger Herbst, 1797
4. Brentus armillatus Kirsch, 1868
5. Brentus calcar Lund, 1800
6. Brentus caudatus Herbst, 1797
7. Brentus clavipes Sharp, 1895
8. Brentus consentaneus Perroud, 1853
9. Brentus cylindrus Lund, 1800
10. Brentus difficilis Boheman, 1840
11. Brentus dignus Kleine, 1943
12. Brentus doellojuradoi Haedo Rossi, 1948
13. Brentus exoptatus Kleine, 1927
14. Brentus extrinsecus Kleine, 1927
15. Brentus festae Griffini, 1899
16. Brentus festivus Senna, 1897
17. Brentus finitimus Kleine, 1927
18. Brentus firmus Kleine, 1927
19. Brentus forcipitigerus (Gyllenhal, 1840)
20. Brentus guatemalenus Sharp, 1895
21. Brentus insperatus Soares & Meyer, 1959
22. Brentus jaegeri Soares, 1959
23. Brentus laticornis Sharp, 1895
24. Brentus linearis Olivier, 1790
25. Brentus lineicollis Boheman, 1833
26. Brentus maculipennis Senna, 1897
27. Brentus maxillosus Olivier, 1807
28. Brentus mexicanus Boheman, 1840
29. Brentus peruvianus Kleine, 1928
30. Brentus quadrilineatus Sharp, 1895
31. Brentus rufescens Sharp, 1895
32. Brentus rufiventris Boheman, 1840
33. Brentus saltensis Haedo Rossi, 1948
34. Brentus sculptipennis Sharp, 1895
35. Brentus signatus Dalman, 1823
36. Brentus soukupi Haedo Rossi, 1959
37. Brentus turbatus Boheman, 1840
38. Brentus variegatus Sharp, 1895
39. Brentus vulneratus Gyllenhal, 1833
