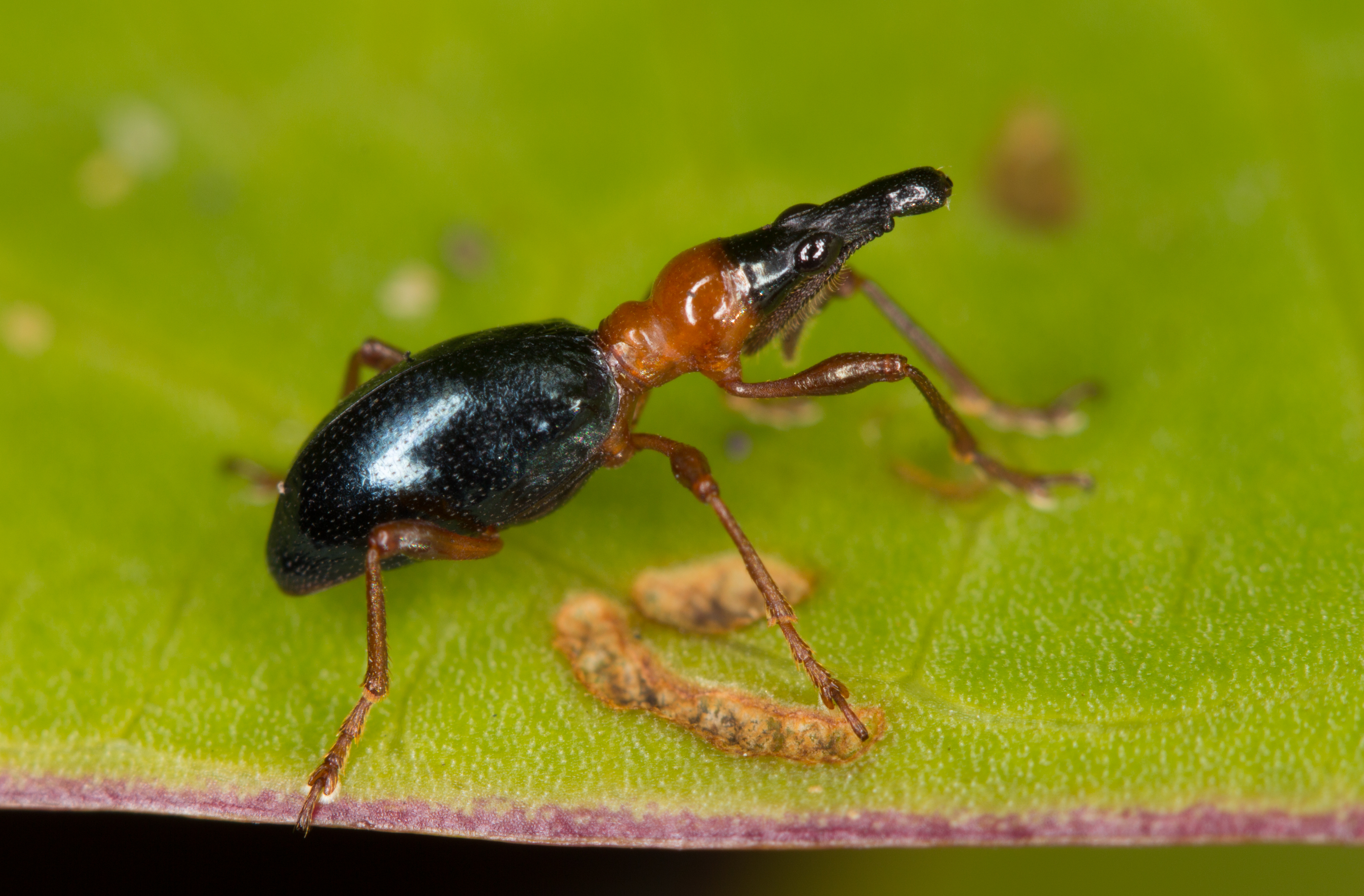
- Cylas formicarius

Scientific classification
- Kingdom: Animalia
- Phylum: Arthropoda
- Class: Insecta
- Order: Coleoptera
- Suborder: Polyphaga
- Infraorder: Cucujiformia
- Family: Brentidae
- Subfamily: Cyladinae
- Genus: Cylas; Latreille, 1802

Synonyms
- Protocylas Pierce, 1941

= Cylas =

Genus of beetles

Cylas is a genus of sweet potato weevils in the subfamily Brentinae and the monogeneric tribe Cyladini. There are more than 20 described species in Cylas.

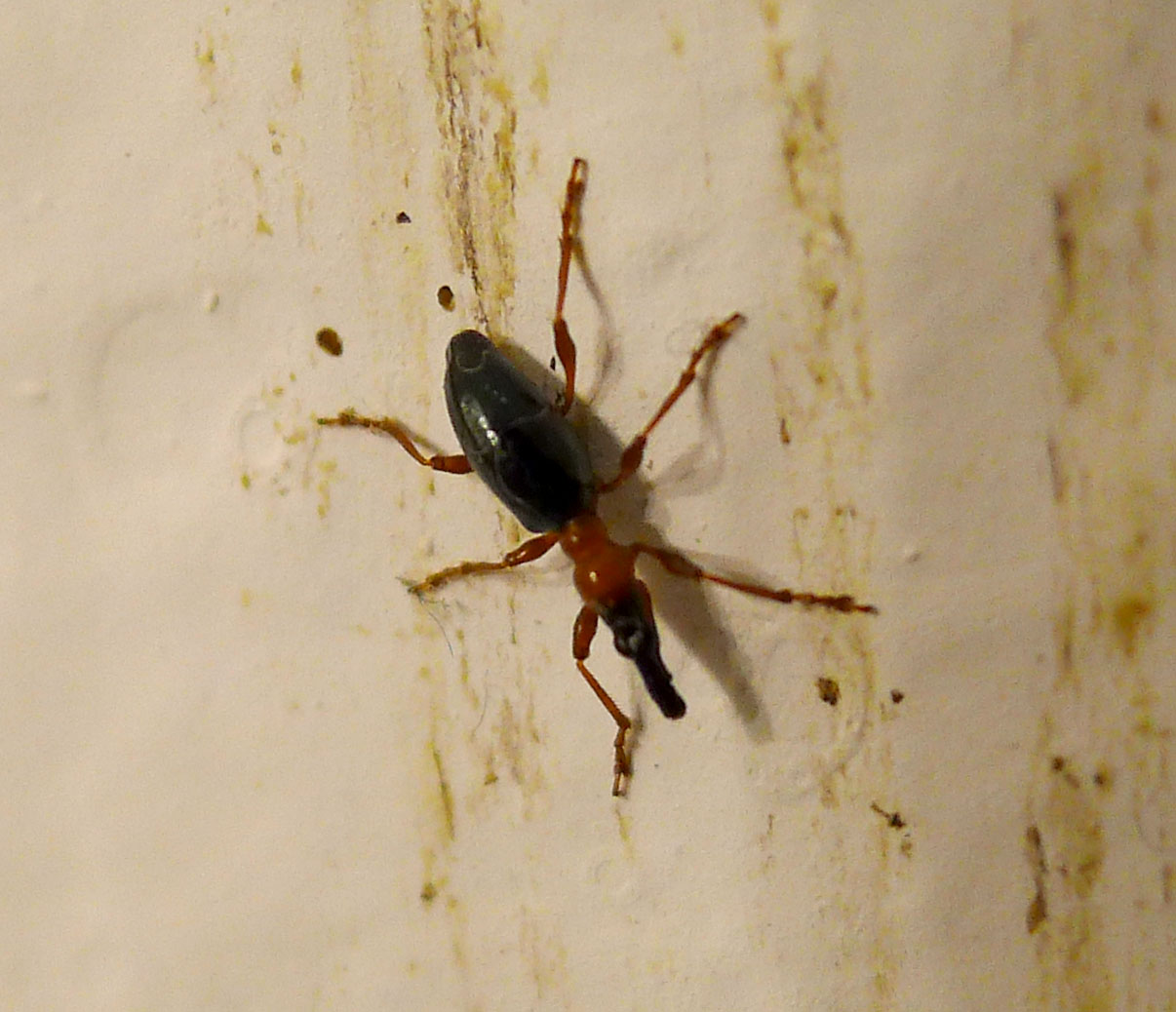
Cylas formicarius

== Species ==
These 24 species belong to the genus Cylas:

- Cylas aeneus Hustache, 1922
- Cylas brunneus (Olivier, 1790)
- Cylas coimbatorensis (Subramanian, 1958)
- Cylas compressus Hartmann, 1899
- Cylas curtipennis Fairmaire, 1884
- Cylas cyanescens Boheman, 1833
- Cylas femoralis Faust, 1898
- Cylas formicarius (Fabricius, 1798) (sweet potato weevil)
- Cylas freyi Voss, 1966
- Cylas glabripennis Hartmann, 1897
- Cylas hovanus Hustache, 1933
- Cylas impunctatus Faust, 1891
- Cylas laevicollis Boheman, 1833
- Cylas laevigatus Fåhraeus, 1871
- Cylas longicollis Guérin-Méneville, 1833
- Cylas nigrocoerulans Fairmaire, 1902
- Cylas nitens Hustache, 1929
- Cylas pumilus Marshall, 1953
- Cylas puncticollis Boheman, 1833
- Cylas robustus Faust, 1895
- Cylas rufipes Faust, 1893
- Cylas semipunctatus Fåhraeus, 1871
- Cylas submetallicus Desbrochers des Loges, 1890
- Cylas vandenplasi Burgeon, 1936
