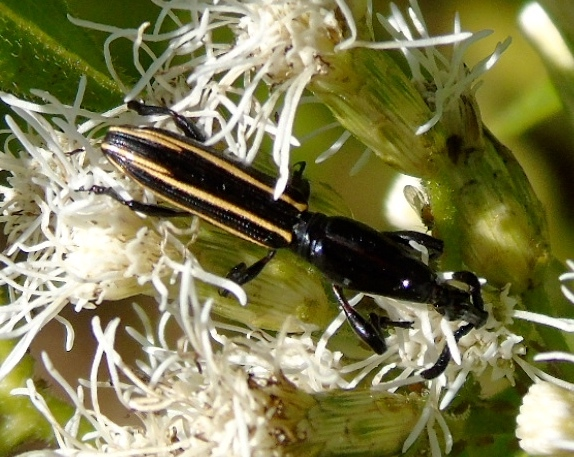

Scientific classification
- Kingdom: Animalia
- Phylum: Arthropoda
- Class: Insecta
- Order: Coleoptera
- Suborder: Polyphaga
- Infraorder: Cucujiformia
- Family: Brentidae
- Genus: Brentus
- Species: B. anchorago

Binomial name
- Brentus anchorago (Linnaeus, 1758)

Synonyms
- Brenthus lucanus Horn, 1872; Brentus anchorago subsp. severa Senna, 1890; Brentus canaliculatus Olivier, 1790; Brentus peregrinus Herbst, 1797; Curculio anchorago Linnaeus, 1758; Curculio hastile Pallas, 1781; Curculio longicollis De Geer, 1775

= Brentus anchorago =

Species of beetle

Brentus anchorago is a long-snouted weevil from the family Brentidae. It is found from southern Florida to South America.

== Description ==
Brentus anchorago is 15 to 52 mm in length. The adult is black in color, with longitudinal yellow marking on the elytra. It has serrate, non-geniculate (elbowed) antennae. The species exhibits significant sexual dimorphism; the males are much thinner than the females.

== Distribution and habitat ==
This widespread neotropical species is known from Mexico, the West Indies and South America. In the U.S. it occurs in Dade and Monroe counties in Florida.

It seems to be associated with the gumbo-limbo tree (Bursera simaruba), throughout its distribution. Larvae bore in dead trees, and the adults can sometimes be found in large numbers under the bark of dead logs.
