= Nemocephalus =

Scientific classification
- Kingdom: Animalia
- Phylum: Arthropoda
- Clade: Pancrustacea
- Class: Insecta
- Order: Coleoptera
- Suborder: Polyphaga
- Infraorder: Cucujiformia
- Family: Brentidae
- Genus: Nemocephalus; Guérin-Méneville, 1827

Genus of insects

Nemocephalus is a genus of beetles belonging to the family Brentidae.

The species of this genus are found in Central America.

Species:

- Nemocephalus avarus (Kleine, 1927)
- Nemocephalus enodis (Kleine, 1927)
