= Heterobrenthus =

Scientific classification
- Kingdom: Animalia
- Phylum: Arthropoda
- Class: Insecta
- Order: Coleoptera
- Suborder: Polyphaga
- Infraorder: Cucujiformia
- Family: Brentidae
- Subtribe: Arrhenodina
- Genus: Heterobrenthus; Sharp, 1895

Genus of beetles

Heterobrenthus is a genus of Central American weevils in the beetle family Brentidae. There are at least three described species in Heterobrenthus.

== Species ==
These three species belong to the genus Heterobrenthus:

- Heterobrenthus distans Sharp, 1895
- Heterobrenthus lacordairei (Power, 1878)
- Heterobrenthus texanus Schaeffer, 1915
