= Desgodinsia =

Scientific classification
- Domain: Eukaryota
- Kingdom: Animalia
- Phylum: Arthropoda
- Class: Insecta
- Order: Coleoptera
- Suborder: Polyphaga
- Infraorder: Cucujiformia
- Family: Brentidae
- Genus: Desgodinsia; Senna, 1894

Genus of beetles

Desgodinsia is a genus of straight-snouted weevils belonging to the family Brentidae.

There are two species recognised:

- Desgodinsia ambigua Kleine, 1923
- Desgodinsia spinirostris Senna, 1894
