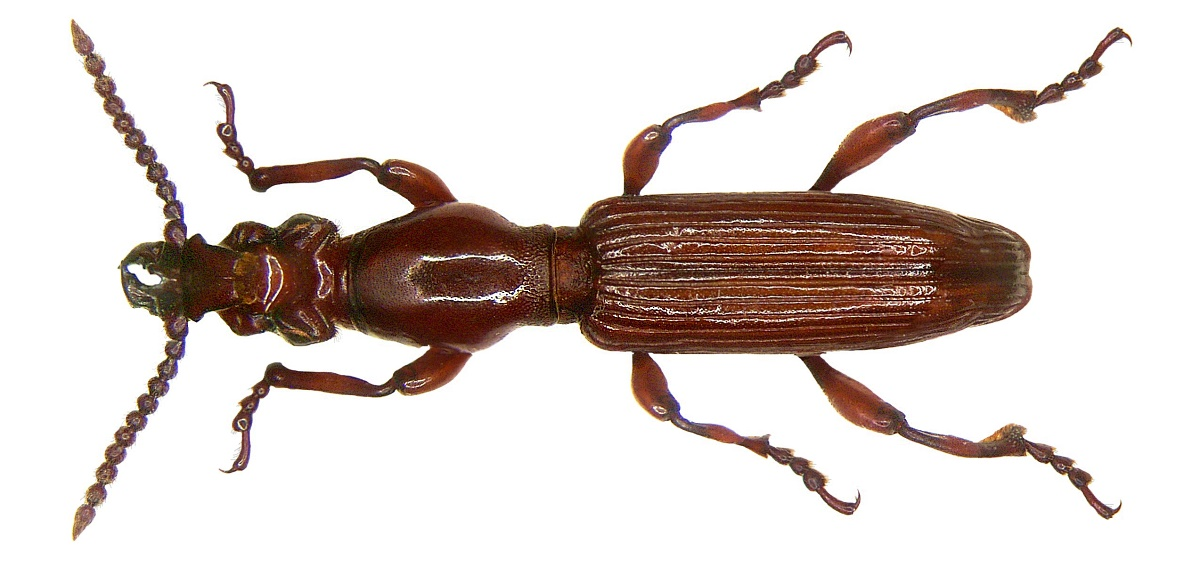
- Amorphocephala coronata

Scientific classification
- Domain: Eukaryota
- Kingdom: Animalia
- Phylum: Arthropoda
- Class: Insecta
- Order: Coleoptera
- Suborder: Polyphaga
- Infraorder: Cucujiformia
- Family: Brentidae
- Subfamily: Brentinae; Billberg, 1820

Synonyms
- Trachelizinae Lacordaire, 1866

= Brentinae =

Subfamily of beetles

Brentinae is a subfamily of sometimes called "straight-snouted weevils" in the family of beetles known as Brentidae; both were based on the type genus Brentus and erected by Gustaf Johan Billberg in 1820.

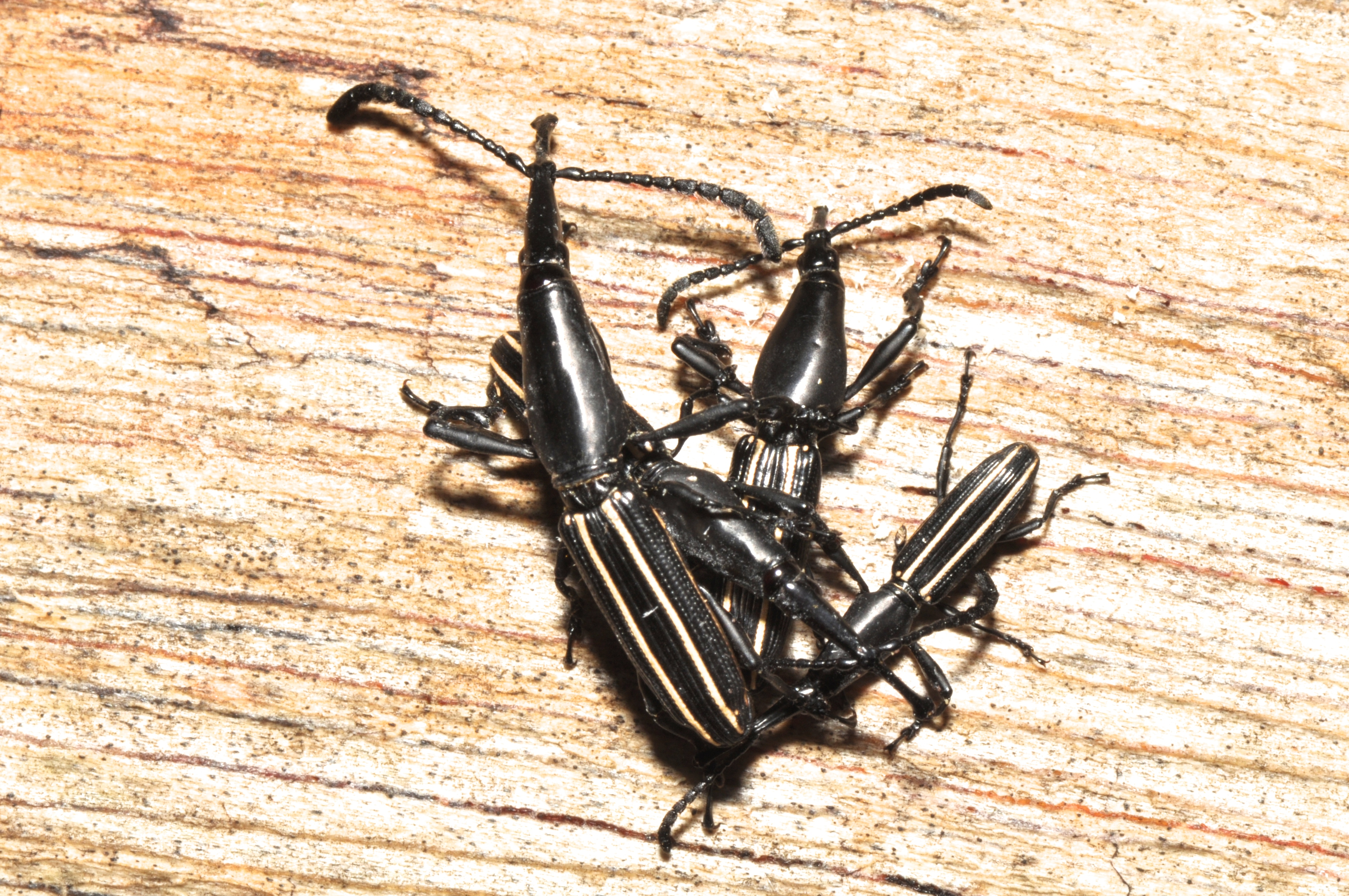
Brentus laticornis

== Tribes and genera ==
BioLib includes seven tribes, three monogeneric:

Brentini Billberg, 1820

Selected genera:

- Arrenodes Schoenherr, 1823^{i c g}
- Baryrhynchus Lacordaire, 1865^{i c g}
- Brentus Fabricius, 1787^{i c g b}
- Cephalobarus Schoenherr, 1840^{i c g}
- Eutrachelus Berthold, 1827^{i c g}
- Heterobrenthus Sharp, 1895^{i c g b}
- Orychodes Pascoe, 1862^{i c g}

Cyladini Schönherr, 1823

1. Cylas Latreille, 1802

Cyphagogini H.J. Kolbe, 1892
Pholidochlamydini Damoiseau, 1962

1. Pholidochlamys Lacordaire, 1866

=== Taphroderini ===
Authority Lacordaire, 1865; all genera:

1. Aulacoderes Chevrolat, 1839 - Madagascar
2. Bolbocranius Kolbe, 1897 - mainland Africa
3. Monrosiaia Haedo Rossi, 1960 - central America
4. Plesiobolbus Kolbe, 1916 - Africa
5. Taphroderes Schönherr, 1823 - Americas
6. Taphroderoides Scivittaro, 1975
7. Taphroderomimus Kleine, 1927
8. Taphroderopsis Scivittaro, 1975

Trachelizini Lacordaire, 1865
Ulocerini Schönherr, 1823

1. Ulocerus Schönherr, 1823

Data sources: i = ITIS, c = Catalogue of Life, g = GBIF, b = Bugguide.net
