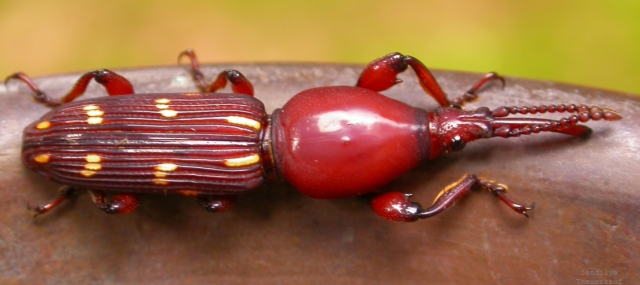
- Orychodes indus from the Western Ghats

Scientific classification
- Kingdom: Animalia
- Phylum: Arthropoda
- Clade: Pancrustacea
- Class: Insecta
- Order: Coleoptera
- Suborder: Polyphaga
- Infraorder: Cucujiformia
- Clade: Phytophaga
- Superfamily: Curculionoidea
- Family: Brentidae; Billberg, 1820

Subfamilies
- Apioninae; Brentinae; Eurhynchinae; ?Ithycerinae; Microcerinae; Nanophyinae

= Brentidae =

Family of beetles

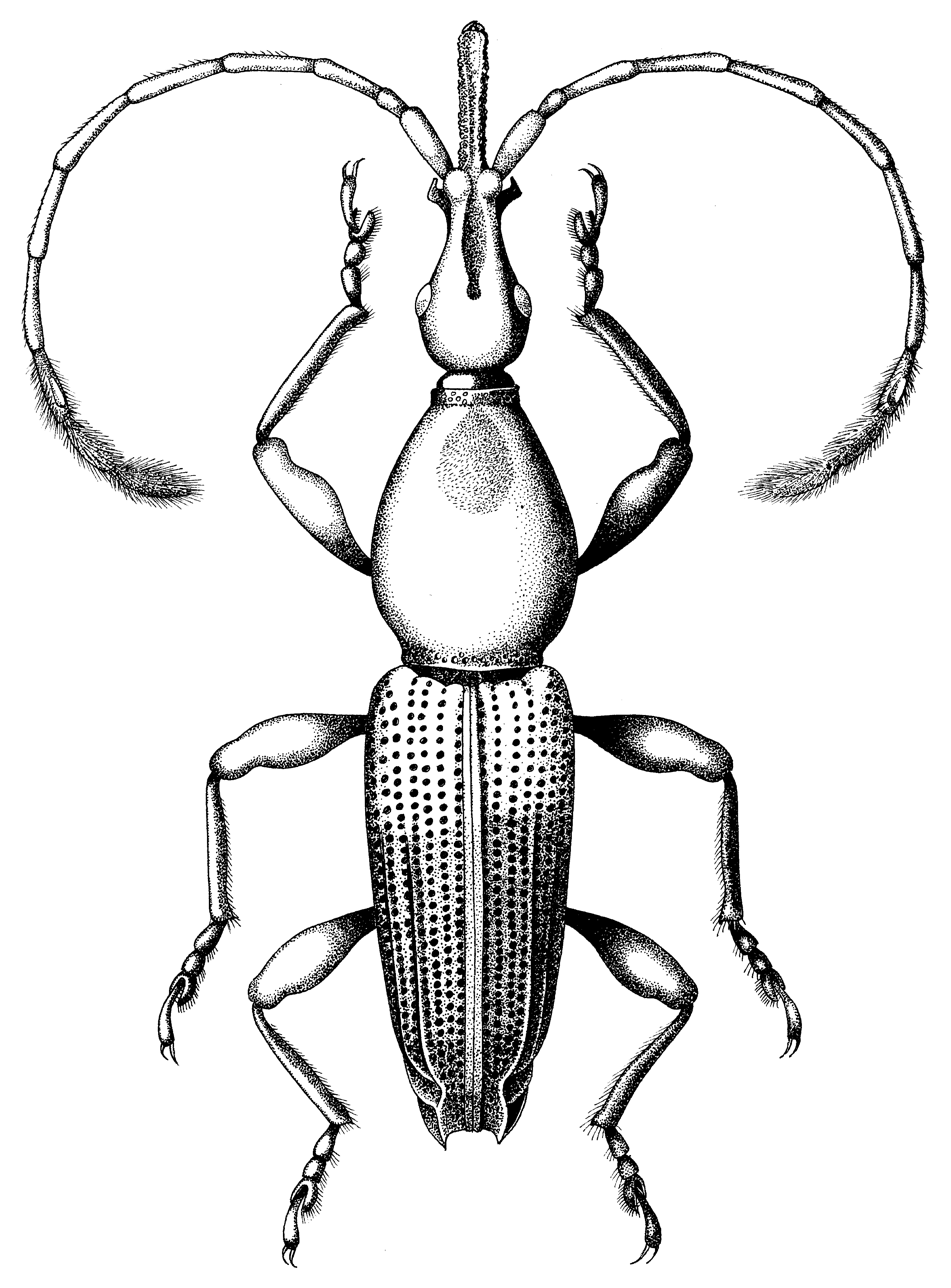
Brentid species illustrated by Des Helmore

Brentidae is a cosmopolitan family of primarily xylophagous beetles also known as straight-snouted weevils; they have sometimes been called "primitive weevils", but this name also applies to taxa such as the Belidae. The concept of this family has been expanded with the inclusion of three groups formerly placed in the Curculionidae; the subfamilies Apioninae, Cyladinae, and Nanophyinae, as well as the Ithycerinae, previously considered a separate family. They are most diverse in the tropics, but occur throughout the temperate regions of the world. They are among the families of weevils that have non-elbowed antennae, and tend to be elongate and flattened, though there are numerous exceptions.

== Classification ==
Holotrichapion pisi is a European member of the subfamily Apioninae

The subfamilial classification of the family has been reorganized by several different authors within the last 20 years, and is not yet stable; the most recent, and conservative, classification (Oberprieler et al., 2007) accepts only 6 subfamilies, with many familiar subfamilial taxa (e.g., Antliarhininae, Cyladinae, Cyphagoginae, Myrmacicelinae and Trachelizinae) now relegated to the corresponding tribal groups, Antliarhinini, Cyladini, Cyphagogini, Myrmacicelini and Trachelizini, primarily within the subfamily Brentinae.

The New York weevil has been included in a broadly defined family definition, placed as the only genus in a subfamily Ithycerinae, This position has not been retained by some authors who treat the genus and its extinct relatives treated as the separate family Ithyceridae.

There are 4000 known species of brentids.

== Description ==
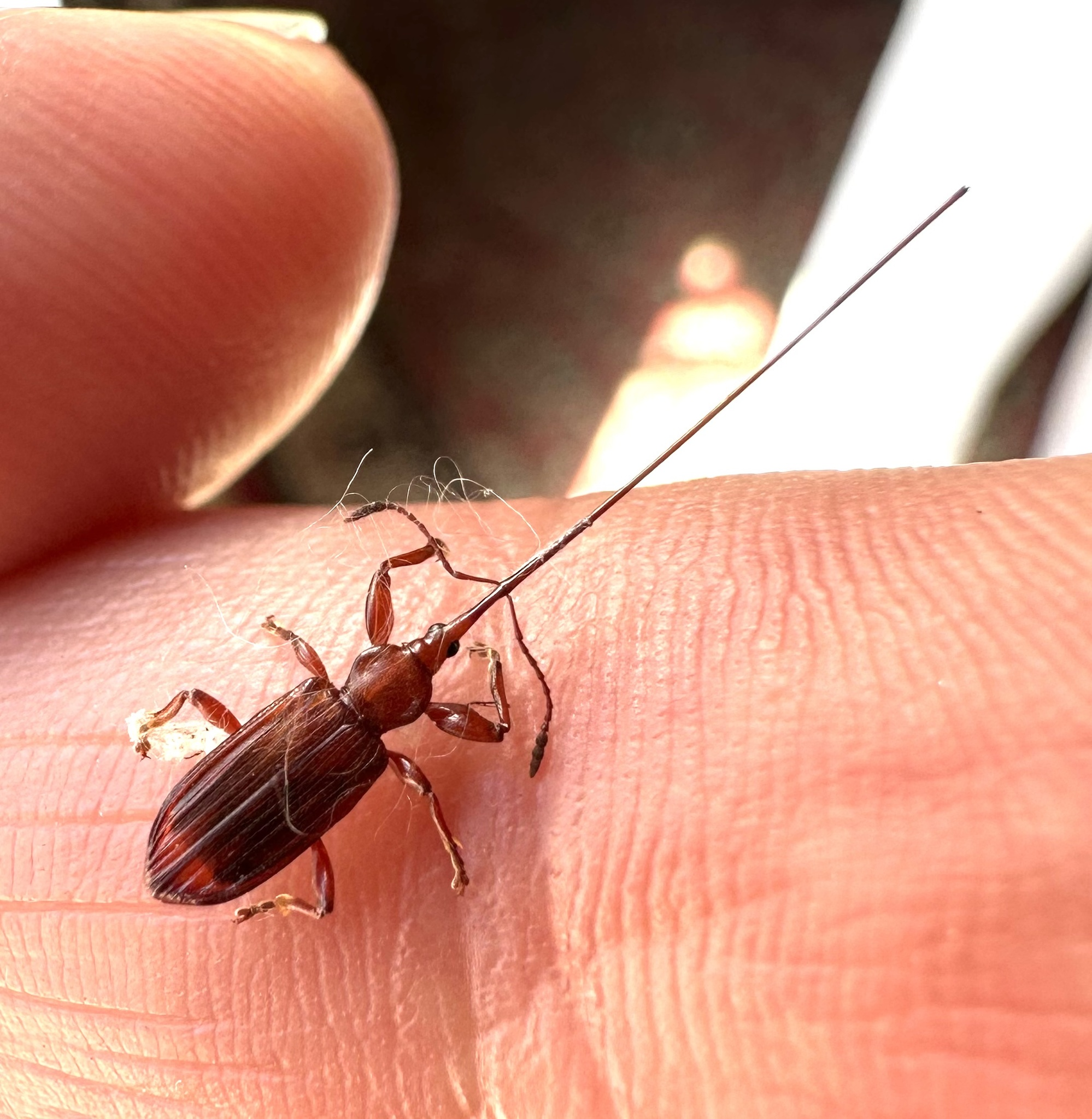
Female of Antliarhis zamiae (Antliarhininae), which have the proportionally longest known snouts among weevils

Brentid larvae are fungivorous, eating fungi on dead wood. The adults are usually long and dark, and can be as small as 1.5 mm or as long as 90.

== See also ==
- Acratini
- List of Brentidae genera
