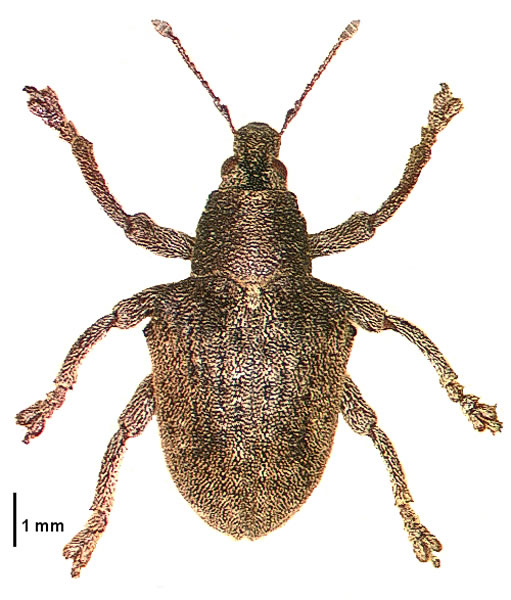

Scientific classification
- Domain: Eukaryota
- Kingdom: Animalia
- Phylum: Arthropoda
- Class: Insecta
- Order: Coleoptera
- Suborder: Polyphaga
- Infraorder: Cucujiformia
- Family: Curculionidae
- Genus: Gonipterus
- Species: G. platensis

Binomial name
- Gonipterus platensis Marelli, 1927

= Gonipterus platensis =

Species of beetle

Gonipterus platensis is a species of weevil in the family Curculionidae. It is commonly known as the eucalyptus snout beetle, the eucalyptus weevil or the gum tree weevil. It feeds and breeds on Eucalyptus trees and is endemic to Australia, though it is also found in New Zealand, North America, Hawaii, India, and western Europe.

== Description ==
This weevil is greyish-brown with a light coloured transverse band. It is about thirteen millimetres long and not readily distinguishable from the closely related weevils, Gonipterus gibberus, Gonipterus pulverulentus, and Gonipterus scutellatus, all of which share the same common names, as they have historically been confused with one another.

== Host plants ==
Eucalyptus trees are the only hosts for the gum tree weevil.

== Distribution ==
The gum tree weevil is endemic to Australia where Eucalyptus trees are native. This and other related species in the genus Gonipterus are invasive pests of eucalyptus in Africa, South America, North America, and Europe, and were historically misidentified as G. scutellatus until researchers examined the DNA of the pest species in 2012 and determined that none of the pests were genuine G. scutellatus. Populations formerly misidentified as Gonipterus scutellatus in New Zealand, North America, Hawaii, and western Europe are Gonipterus platensis, and those in Africa and eastern Europe are an undescribed species.

== Significance ==
This particular gum tree weevil is of little economic significance in Australia where it has natural enemies. Because of the confusion between this species and related species in all of the published literature prior to 2012, and much of the subsequent literature, it is difficult to assess which properties (life cycle, host preferences, and other ecological parameters) pertain to this species. In other countries where Eucalyptus has been introduced, gum tree weevils feed mostly on leaves and the soft bark of twigs while the larvae feed mostly on leaves. Heavy infestations cause die back of shoots which may result in the development of epicormic shoots. Repeated defoliations may cause the splitting and death of branches or even whole trees. The egg parasite Anaphes nitens, a wasp which is native to Australia, has been introduced to other countries as a biological control agent to control the gum tree weevil.
