= Anaphes nitens =

Scientific classification
- Kingdom: Animalia
- Phylum: Arthropoda
- Clade: Pancrustacea
- Class: Insecta
- Order: Hymenoptera
- Family: Mymaridae
- Genus: Anaphes
- Species: A. nitens

Binomial name
- Anaphes nitens (Girault, 1928)

Species of wasp

Anaphes nitens is a species of fairyfly, a chalcid wasp in the family Mymaridae. Native to Australia, it is an egg parasitoid of the gum tree snout beetle (Gonipterus platensis), a pest of Eucalyptus trees, and has been used in biological pest control of that species.

== Description ==
Like other species in its genus, Anaphes nitens is a tiny insect, not more than one millimetre (0.04 in) long. The hind wings are elongated and stalked, and there are short hairs fringing both pairs of wings. The head and body are black, the limbs are amber to brown and the wings are tinged with brown.

== Ecology ==
Anaphes nitens is native to southeastern Australia. The adult wasps feed on nectar and honeydew, but the larvae are carnivorous and feed on the eggs of the gum tree snout beetle (Gonipterus platensis, formerly misidentified under the name Gonipterus scutellatus). Both this beetle and its larvae feed on the young leaves, buds and shoots of various species of Eucalyptus, causing a slowing of the growth of the tree, a contortion of the twigs and sometimes a dieback of the branches. The female snout beetle lays batches of about ten eggs enclosed in capsules with hard shells. The female wasp deposits her eggs in the egg capsules and the developing wasp larvae feed on the snout beetle eggs inside the capsule.

Eucalyptus trees are now grown in many countries around the world, and the gum tree snout beetle has been accidentally introduced with the tree, causing defoliation in plantations. This is the case in South Africa, which harbors an undescribed species of eucalyptus-feeding Gonipterus and A. nitens has been introduced to the country to attempt to provide biological control of the pest. In Spain, it has also been successfully used to control G. platensis. In this case, the snout beetle is found to have three main egg-laying periods, April, July and November. The April eggs are the most heavily parasitised and it has been found that the larvae of the chalcid wasps are able to diapause in the November eggs, enabling the parasitoid to endure winter conditions that are unsuitable for the survival of the adult wasps.
