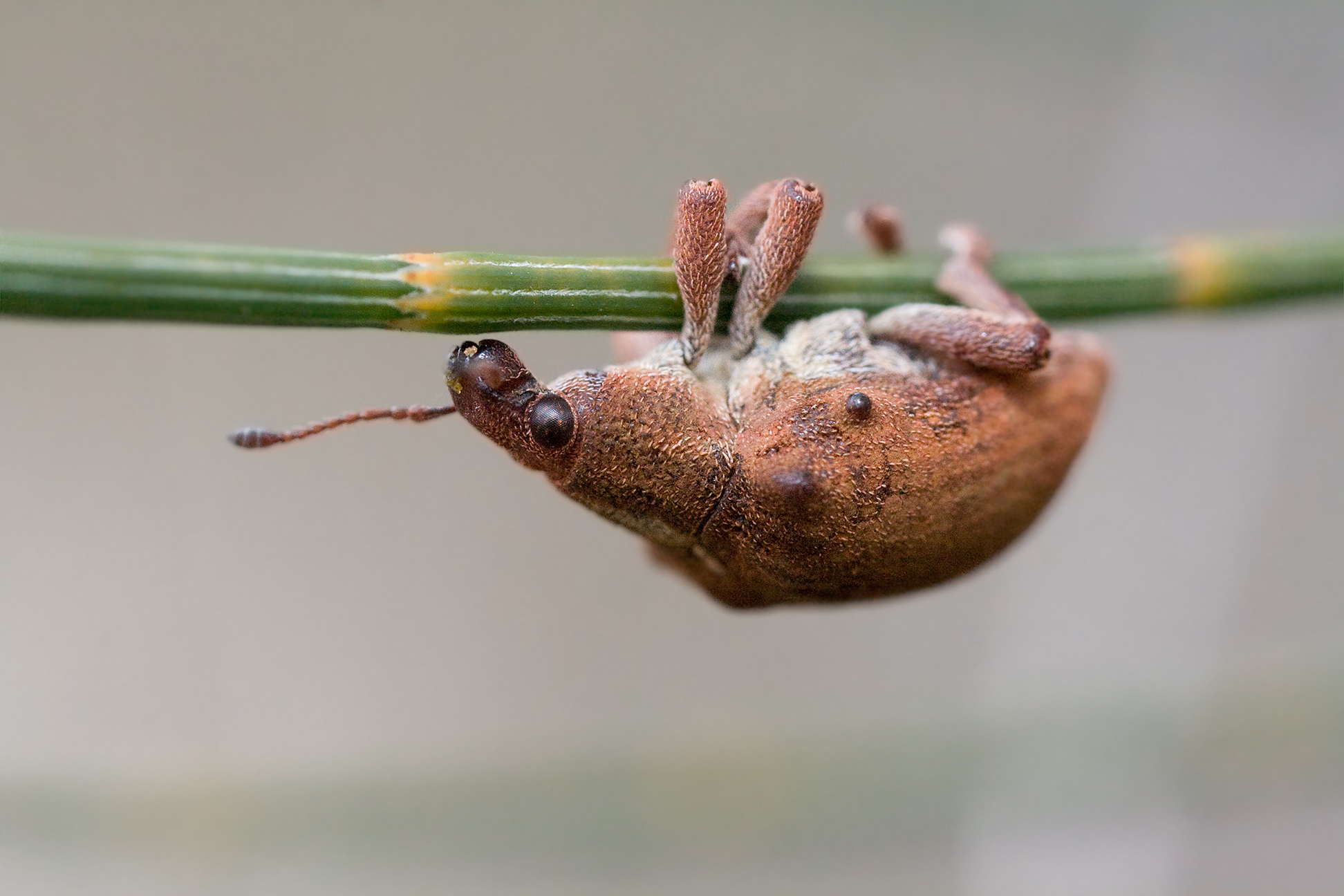
- Gonipterus gibberus on Casuarina sp

Scientific classification
- Kingdom: Animalia
- Phylum: Arthropoda
- Class: Insecta
- Order: Coleoptera
- Suborder: Polyphaga
- Infraorder: Cucujiformia
- Family: Curculionidae
- Subfamily: Curculioninae
- Tribe: Gonipterini; Lacordaire, 1863

Genera
- Bryachus; Carterorhinus; Gonipterus; Iptergonus; Minia; Oxyops; Pantoreites; Prophaesia; Syarbis

= Gonipterini =

Tribe of beetles

Gonipterini is a tribe of weevils in the subfamily Curculioninae.

The larvae and adults are usually found on eucalyptus trees, where they feed upon the foliage. The larvae are legless and slug-like in appearance. The adults have a broad body, and short stout rostrum.
