= Gonipterus pulverulentus =

Scientific classification
- Domain: Eukaryota
- Kingdom: Animalia
- Phylum: Arthropoda
- Class: Insecta
- Order: Coleoptera
- Suborder: Polyphaga
- Infraorder: Cucujiformia
- Family: Curculionidae
- Genus: Gonipterus
- Species: G. pulverulentus

Binomial name
- Gonipterus pulverulentus Lea, 1897

Species of beetle

Gonipterus pulverulentus is a species of weevil in the family Curculionidae. It is commonly known as the eucalyptus snout beetle, the eucalyptus weevil or the gum tree weevil. It feeds and breeds on Eucalyptus trees and is endemic to Australia, though it is also found in South America.

== Description ==
This weevil is greyish-brown with a light coloured transverse band. It is about thirteen millimetres long and not readily distinguishable from the closely related weevils, Gonipterus gibberus, Gonipterus platensis, and Gonipterus scutellatus, all of which share the same common names, as they have historically been confused with one another.

== Host plants ==
Eucalyptus trees are the only hosts for the gum tree weevil.

== Distribution ==
The gum tree weevil is endemic to Australia where Eucalyptus trees are native. This and other related species in the genus Gonipterus are invasive pests of eucalyptus in Africa, South America, North America, and Europe, and were historically misidentified as G. scutellatus until researchers examined the DNA of the pest species in 2012 and determined that none of the pests were genuine G. scutellatus. Populations formerly misidentified as Gonipterus scutellatus in New Zealand, North America, and western Europe are Gonipterus platensis, and those in Africa and eastern Europe are an undescribed species. Populations in South America were originally identified as G. scutellatus, and in 1996 were reclassified as G. gibberus, but this was also an error; these populations are now recognized as G. pulverulentus.
