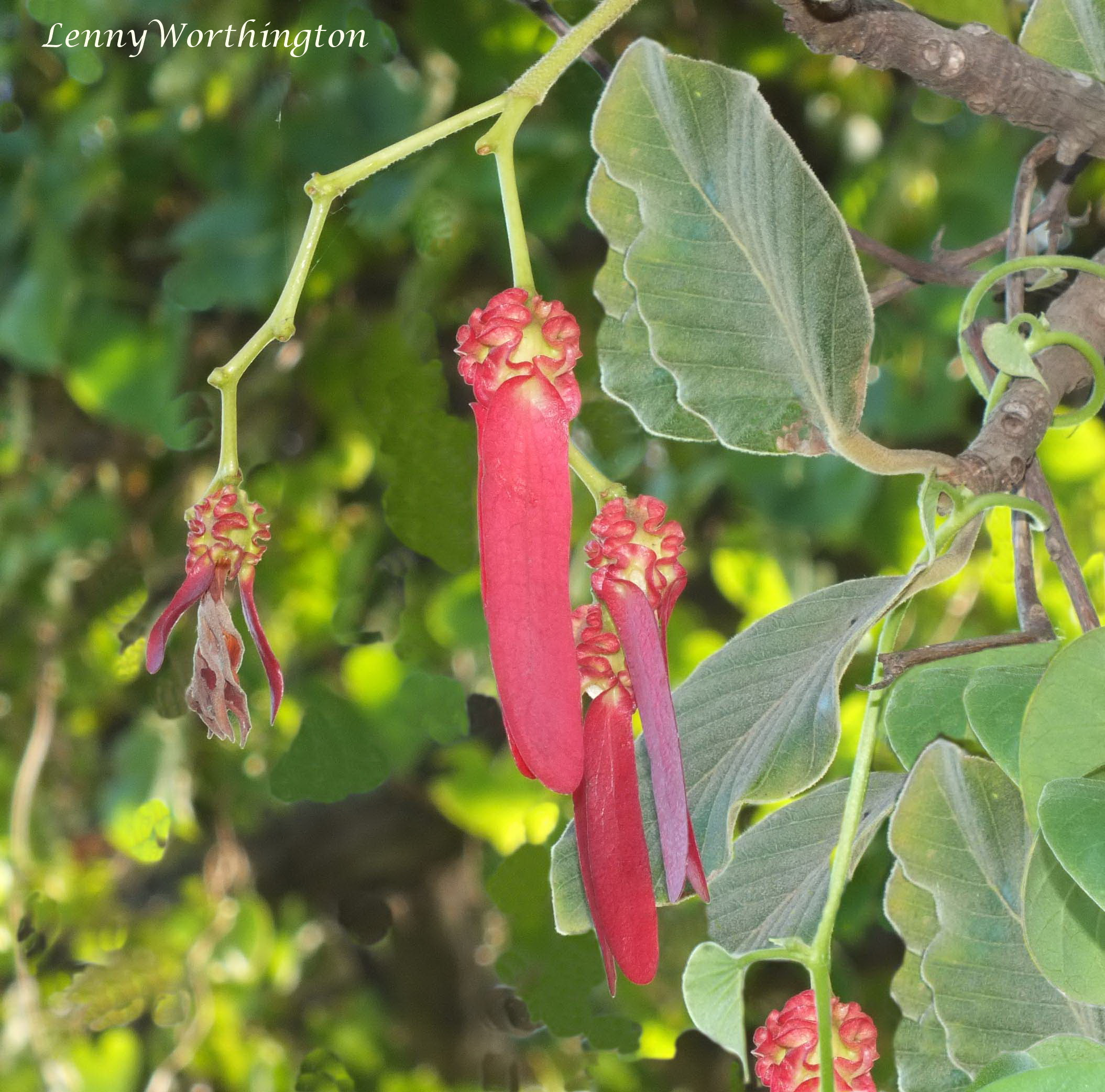

Conservation status
- Endangered (IUCN 3.1)

Scientific classification
- Kingdom: Plantae
- Clade: Embryophytes
- Clade: Tracheophytes
- Clade: Angiosperms
- Clade: Eudicots
- Clade: Rosids
- Order: Malvales
- Family: Dipterocarpaceae
- Genus: Dipterocarpus
- Species: D. intricatus

Binomial name
- Dipterocarpus intricatus Dyer, J. Bot. 12: 105, t. 145, fig. 21 (1874)

= Dipterocarpus intricatus =

Species of tree

Dipterocarpus intricatus (Khmer: tra:ch (ត្រាច), tra:ch sa (ត្រាចស), tra:ch snaèng (ត្រាចស្នែង), tra:ch sra: (ត្រាចស្រា), Thai: ยางกราด (yang-krat)) is a species of tree in the family Dipterocarpaceae found in Thailand, Cambodia, Laos and Vietnam.

The tree, itself deciduous, is found in dense deciduous forests and clear forests. It is often met in pure stands in deciduous, periodically flooded lowland forests, but can also be found in dense forest at up to 1300m altitude. In Thailand it sometimes occurs growing gregariously with D. obtusifolious, D. tuberculatus, Shorea robusta and S. siamensis, sometimes in pure stands forming the climatic dry deciduous dipterocarp forest. This forest type covered a large area of eastern, north-eastern and northern Thailand, from peneplain at 150-300m elevations to slope and ridges up to 1300m above sea level. It does also occur in Lowland dipterocarp forest (0-350m) in Thailand. In Vietnam, it is described as common in dry forests. The tree prefers poor, sandy and lateritic soils derived from granitic and sandstone formations. Seedlings develop hardy rootstock and thick rough bark on the stout stem, affording fire-protection in the ground-fire prone early hot dry season. Coppicing occurs freely up to a moderate size. In Thailand leaves are shed from November, defoliation is complete by February, with leaf starting at this time, or sometimes a little before. Flowering occurs from February to April, fruiting from April to May, though in certain areas or some years with a late rainy season these periods start up to 3 months earlier. The species grows from 15 to 30m tall.

The fruit has 2 prominent, elongated, netted wings, 6–8 cm long x 1.5–2 cm wide, on top of an ovoid or ellipsoid fruit-body, 1.5–2 cm long x 1-1.5 cm wide, with undulate ribs, 2-3mm wide.

In Cambodia the resin is mainly used in torch-preparation, while the red-brown wood is "appreciated" for cart and house construction. Sold as "fancy wings" in the potpourri trade

The genus Nanophyes is associated with seed predation of D. intricatus.

== Further information ==
- Ban, N.T., 1997, Some remarks on the red list summary report
- Loc, P.K., 1992, Annotations to: Conservation status listing for Vietnam, dated 25 March 1992 (unpublished)
- Oldfield, S., C. Lusty & A. MacKinven, (compilers), 1998, The World List of Threatened Trees, World Conservation Press, Cambridge, England
- Phengklai C., Khamsai S. (1985). "Some non-timber species of Thailand". Thai Forest Bulletin (Botany). 1 (15): 108–48.
- Rao Y.S. (1992). "Forest news". Tigerpaper. 4: 1–2.
