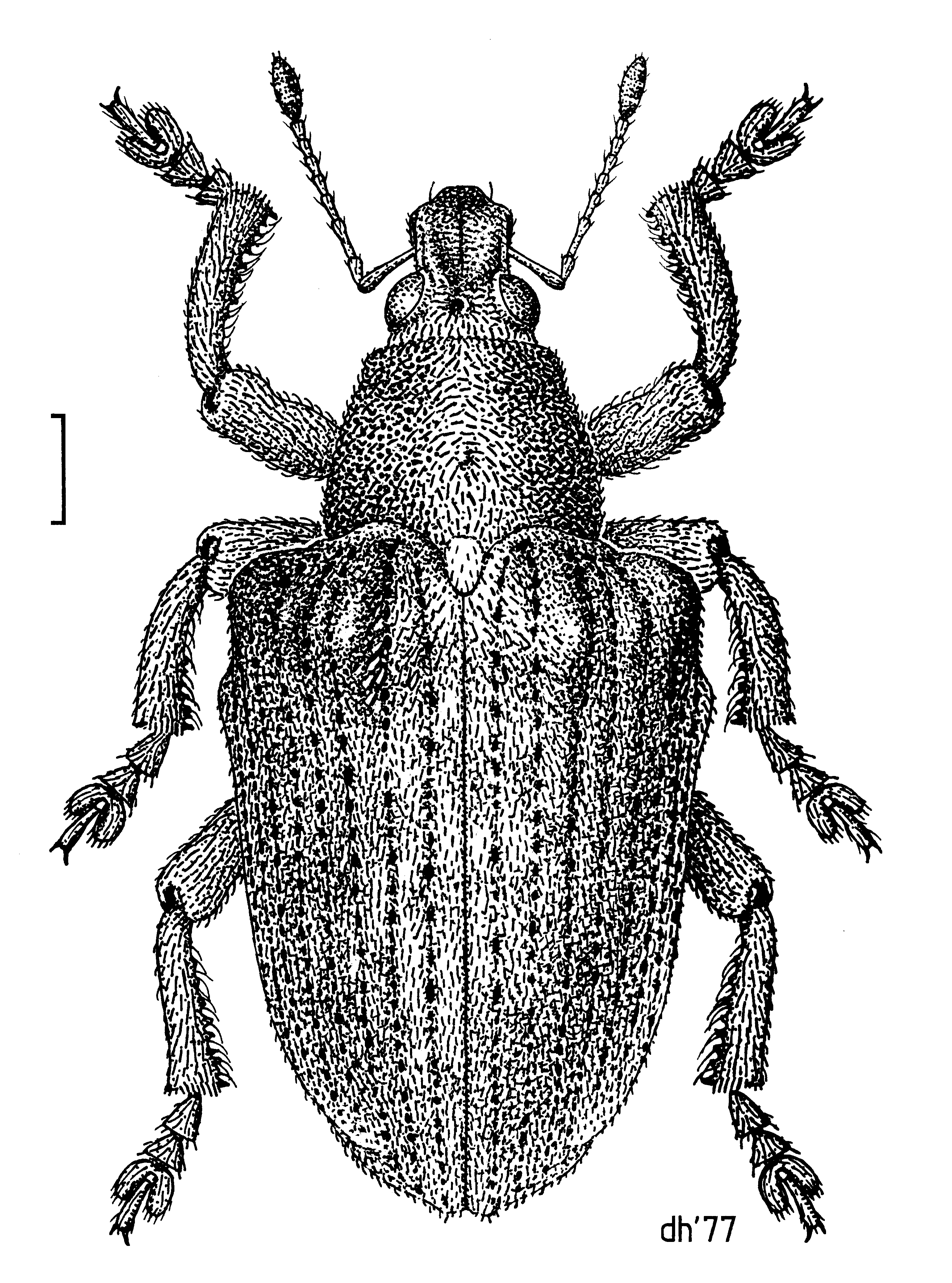
- Illustration by Des Helmore

Scientific classification
- Kingdom: Animalia
- Phylum: Arthropoda
- Class: Insecta
- Order: Coleoptera
- Suborder: Polyphaga
- Infraorder: Cucujiformia
- Family: Curculionidae
- Genus: Gonipterus
- Species: G. scutellatus

Binomial name
- Gonipterus scutellatus Gyllenhal, 1833

= Gonipterus scutellatus =

Species of beetle

Gonipterus scutellatus is a species of weevil in the family Curculionidae. It is commonly known as the eucalyptus snout beetle, the eucalyptus weevil or the gum tree weevil. It feeds and breeds on Eucalyptus trees and is endemic to Australia.

== Description ==
This weevil is greyish-brown with a light coloured transverse band. It is about thirteen millimetres long and not readily distinguishable from the closely related weevils, Gonipterus gibberus, Gonipterus platensis, and Gonipterus pulverulentus, all of which share the same common names, as they have historically been confused with one another.

== Host plants ==
Eucalyptus trees are the only hosts for the gum tree weevil.

== Distribution ==
The gum tree weevil is endemic to Australia where Eucalyptus trees are native. Related species in the genus Gonipterus are invasive pests of eucalyptus in Africa, South America, North America, and Europe, and were historically misidentified as G. scutellatus until researchers examined the DNA of the pest species in 2012 and determined that none of the pests were genuine G. scutellatus. Populations formerly misidentified as Gonipterus scutellatus in New Zealand, North America, and western Europe are Gonipterus platensis, and those in Africa and eastern Europe are an undescribed species.

== Significance ==
This particular gum tree weevil is of little economic significance in Australia where it has natural enemies, and it does not occur in any other countries. Because of the confusion between this species and related species, all of the published literature prior to 2012, and much of the subsequent literature, mistakenly attributes properties such as life cycle, host preferences, and other ecological parameters to this species, when in fact they refer to other species.
