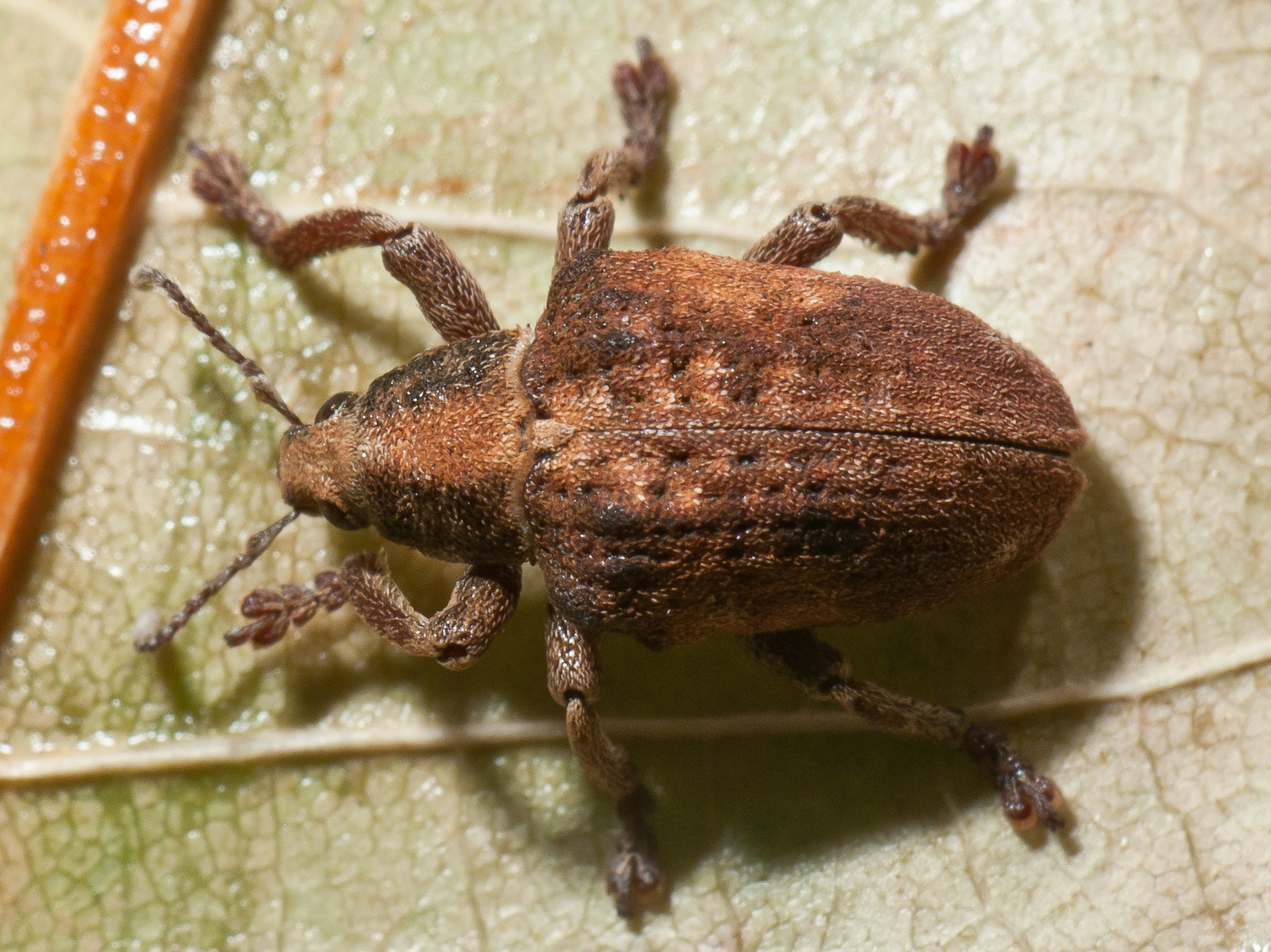
- undescribed species of Gonipterus

Scientific classification
- Domain: Eukaryota
- Kingdom: Animalia
- Phylum: Arthropoda
- Class: Insecta
- Order: Coleoptera
- Suborder: Polyphaga
- Infraorder: Cucujiformia
- Family: Curculionidae
- Tribe: Gonipterini
- Genus: Gonipterus; Schoenherr, 1833

Species
- about 20

= Gonipterus =

Genus of beetles

Gonipterus is a genus of weevils in the family Curculionidae. There are approximately 20 described species in the genus, most of which are native to Australia. They are all plant feeders and many are specific to a single host species. Gonipterus platensis, Gonipterus pulverulentus, and an undescribed species infest a number of species of Eucalyptus and have spread to other parts of the world where these trees have been planted.

Populations formerly misidentified as Gonipterus scutellatus in New Zealand, North America, and western Europe are Gonipterus platensis, and those in Africa and eastern Europe are an undescribed species. These were historically all misidentified as G. scutellatus until researchers examined the DNA of the pest species in 2012 and determined that none of the pests were genuine G. scutellatus. Populations in South America formerly identified as Gonipterus gibberus, are now recognized to be G. pulverulentus.

== Species ==
Species include:

- Gonipterus balteatus Pascoe, 1870
- Gonipterus bimaculatus Lea, 1927
- Gonipterus bruchi Marshall, 1927
- Gonipterus cancellatus Lea, 1901
- Gonipterus cinnamomeus Pascoe, 1870
- Gonipterus cionoides Pascoe, 1870
- Gonipterus citrophagus Lea, 1897
- Gonipterus conicollis Lea, 1927
- Gonipterus crassipes Lea, 1897
- Gonipterus exaratus Fåhraeus, 1840
- Gonipterus excavatus Boisduval, 1835
- Gonipterus excavifrons Lea, 1897
- Gonipterus fasciatus Boisduval, 1835
- Gonipterus ferrugatus Pascoe, 1870
- Gonipterus geminatus Lea, 1897
- Gonipterus gibberus Boisduval, 1835
- Gonipterus humeralis Lea, 1897
- Gonipterus hyperoides Pascoe, 1871
- Gonipterus inconspicuus Lea, 1927
- Gonipterus kanalensis Perroud & Montrouzier, 1862
- Gonipterus lateritius Lea, 1927
- Gonipterus lepidopterus Schoenherr, 1840
- Gonipterus lepidotus Gyllenhaal, 1833
- Gonipterus marellii Uyttenboogaart in Marelli, 1928
- Gonipterus notographus Boisduval, 1835
- Gonipterus parallelicollis Lea, 1927
- Gonipterus platensis Marelli, 1927
- Gonipterus pulverulentus Lea, 1897
- Gonipterus reticulatus Boisduval, 1835
- Gonipterus rufus Blackburn, 1892
- Gonipterus scabrosus Boisduval, 1835
- Gonipterus scutellatus Gyllenhaal, 1833
- Gonipterus sepulchralis Pascoe, 1870
- Gonipterus subfasciatus Lacordaire, 1863
- Gonipterus suturalis Gyllenhaal, 1833
- Gonipterus turbidus Pascoe, 1871
- Gonipterus xanthorrhoeae Lea, 1897
