= Tentegia =

Scientific classification
- Kingdom: Animalia
- Phylum: Arthropoda
- Clade: Pancrustacea
- Class: Insecta
- Order: Coleoptera
- Suborder: Polyphaga
- Infraorder: Cucujiformia
- Family: Curculionidae
- Tribe: Cryptorhynchini
- Genus: Tentegia; Pascoe, 1873

Type species
- Tentegia favosa Pascoe, 1873

Genus of weevils

Tentegia is a genus of weevils native to Australia. It is the only genus of weevils known to engage in coprophagy.

== Distribution and habitat ==
Tentegia species are widely distributed in arid and monsoonal areas of Australia, including parts of New South Wales, Northern Territory, Queensland, South Australia, Victoria, and Western Australia, with the Northern Territory hosting the highest number of species.

== Ecology ==
The coprophagous habits of some Tentegia species, similar to that of dung beetles, are unique among weevils. Adult Tentegia stupida beetles collect marsupial dung and cache it under logs. The adults mate on or near the dung and the female deposits a single egg within each dung pellet. The larvae feed on and develop within the dung pellets, eventually pupating inside the pellet and finally emerging as an adult beetle. Adults are also known to feed directly on the dung pellets. Similar habits are suspected in T. amplipennis and T. bisignata, but it is unknown if other members of the genus engage in coprophagy or dung rolling.

== Species ==
This genus includes the following species:

- Tentegia amplipennis Lea, 1930 (Northern Territory)
- Tentegia bisignata (Pascoe, 1874) (New South Wales, Queensland)
- Tentegia favosa Pascoe, 1873 (New South Wales, South Australia, Victoria)
- Tentegia grossbechleri Escalona, Jennings & Oberprieler, 2023 (Northern Territory)
- Tentegia parva Blackburn, 1896 (Northern Territory)
- Tentegia quadriseriata Lea, 1912 (Queensland)
- Tentegia sana Faust, 1892 (Queensland)
- Tentegia spenceri Blackburn, 1896 (Northern Territory, Queensland, Western Australia)
- Tentegia stupida (Fabricius, 1775) (Northern Territory, Queensland)
- Tentegia tompsetti Escalona, Jennings & Oberprieler, 2023 (Northern Territory)
- Tentegia tortipes Lea, 1912 (Northern Territory)
- Tentegia weiri Escalona, Jennings & Oberprieler, 2023 (Northern Territory)
