= Caridae =

Scientific classification
- Kingdom: Animalia
- Phylum: Arthropoda
- Clade: Pancrustacea
- Class: Insecta
- Order: Coleoptera
- Suborder: Polyphaga
- Infraorder: Cucujiformia
- Clade: Phytophaga
- Superfamily: Curculionoidea
- Family: Caridae; Thompson, 1992

Genera
- Caenominurus; Car Blackb., 1897; Carodes; Chilecar

Family of beetles

Caridae is a small Gondwanan family of weevils. They are considered part of the primitive weevil group, because they have straight rather than geniculate (elbowed) antennae. The insertion of the antennae on the rostrum cannot be seen from above. Caridae also lack spiracles on abdominal tergites 6 and 7. The prothorax lacks lateral carinae. It has been suggested that the fossil weevil Eccoptarthrus belongs in this family, which would result in a change in the family name (as "Eccoptarthridae" would have seniority); this proposal has been rejected by most coleopterists (e.g.)

They are usually found on trees from the Cupressaceae. The genus Car has been found on Callitris, and Caenominurus on Austrocedrus and Pilgerodendron.
