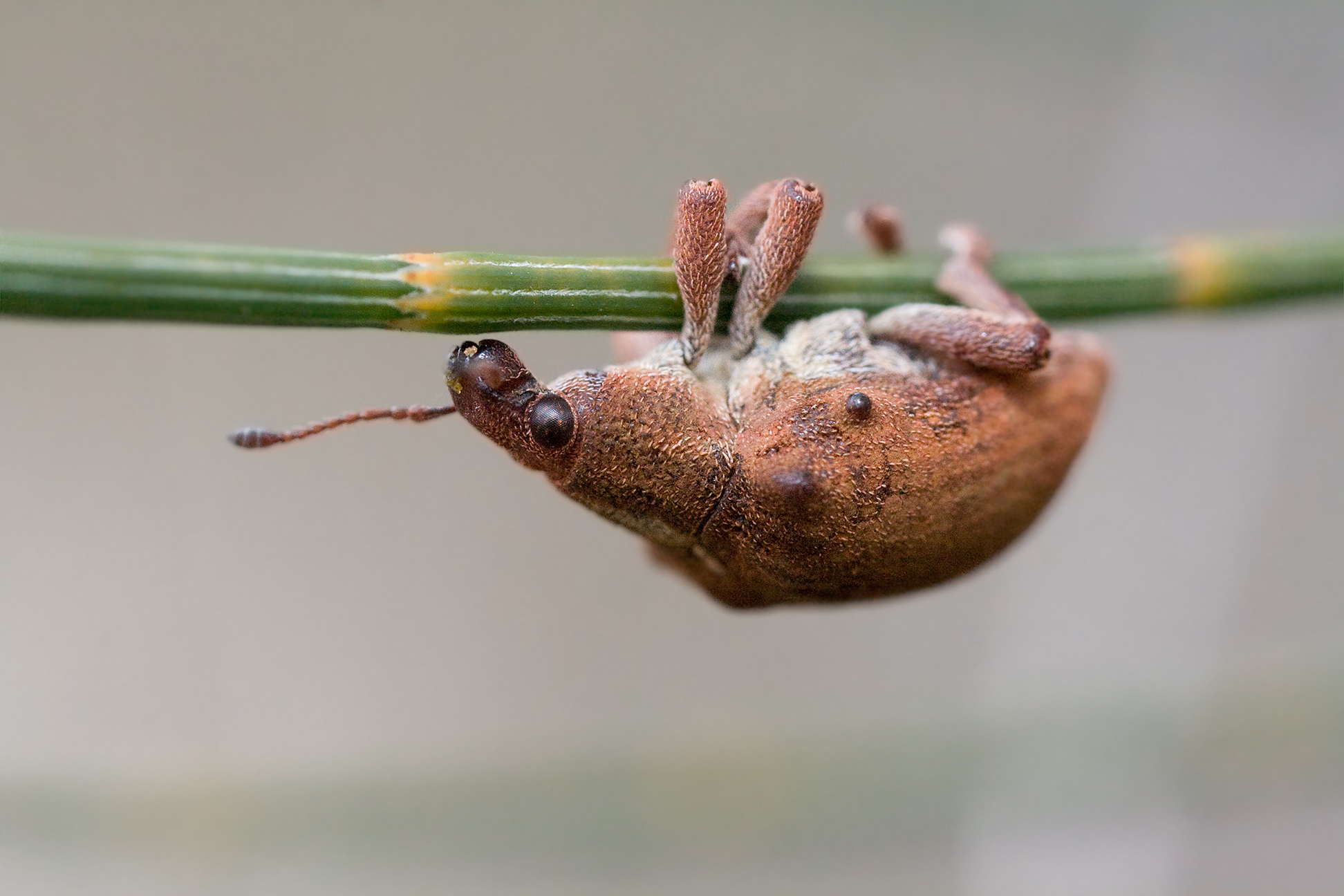

Scientific classification
- Domain: Eukaryota
- Kingdom: Animalia
- Phylum: Arthropoda
- Class: Insecta
- Order: Coleoptera
- Suborder: Polyphaga
- Infraorder: Cucujiformia
- Family: Curculionidae
- Genus: Gonipterus
- Species: G. gibberus

Binomial name
- Gonipterus gibberus Boisduval, 1835

Synonyms
- Dacnirotatus bruchi Marelli

= Gonipterus gibberus =

Species of beetle

Gonipterus gibberus is a species of weevil in the family Curculionidae. It is commonly known as the eucalyptus snout beetle, the eucalyptus weevil or the gum tree weevil. It feeds and breeds on Eucalyptus trees and is endemic to Australia.

== Description ==
This weevil is greyish-brown with a light coloured transverse band. It is about thirteen millimetres long and not readily distinguishable from the closely related weevils, Gonipterus platensis, Gonipterus pulverulentus, and Gonipterus scutellatus, all of which share the same common names, as they have historically been confused with one another.

== Host plants ==
Eucalyptus trees are the only hosts for the gum tree weevil.

== Distribution ==
The gum tree weevil is endemic to Australia where Eucalyptus trees are native. Related species in the genus Gonipterus are invasive pests of eucalyptus in China, Africa, South America, North America, and Europe, and were historically misidentified as G. scutellatus until researchers examined the DNA of the pest species in 2012 and determined that none of the pests were genuine G. scutellatus. The populations in South America, which were initially identified as G. scutellatus, and later identified in 1996 as being G. gibberus, are actually G. pulverulentus.

== Significance ==
This particular gum tree weevil is of little economic significance in Australia where it has natural enemies, and it does not occur in any other countries. Because of the confusion between this species and related species, all of the published literature on South American populations of G. gibberus prior to 2012, and much of the subsequent literature, mistakenly attributes properties such as life cycle, host preferences, and other ecological parameters to this species, when in fact they refer to G. pulverulentus.
