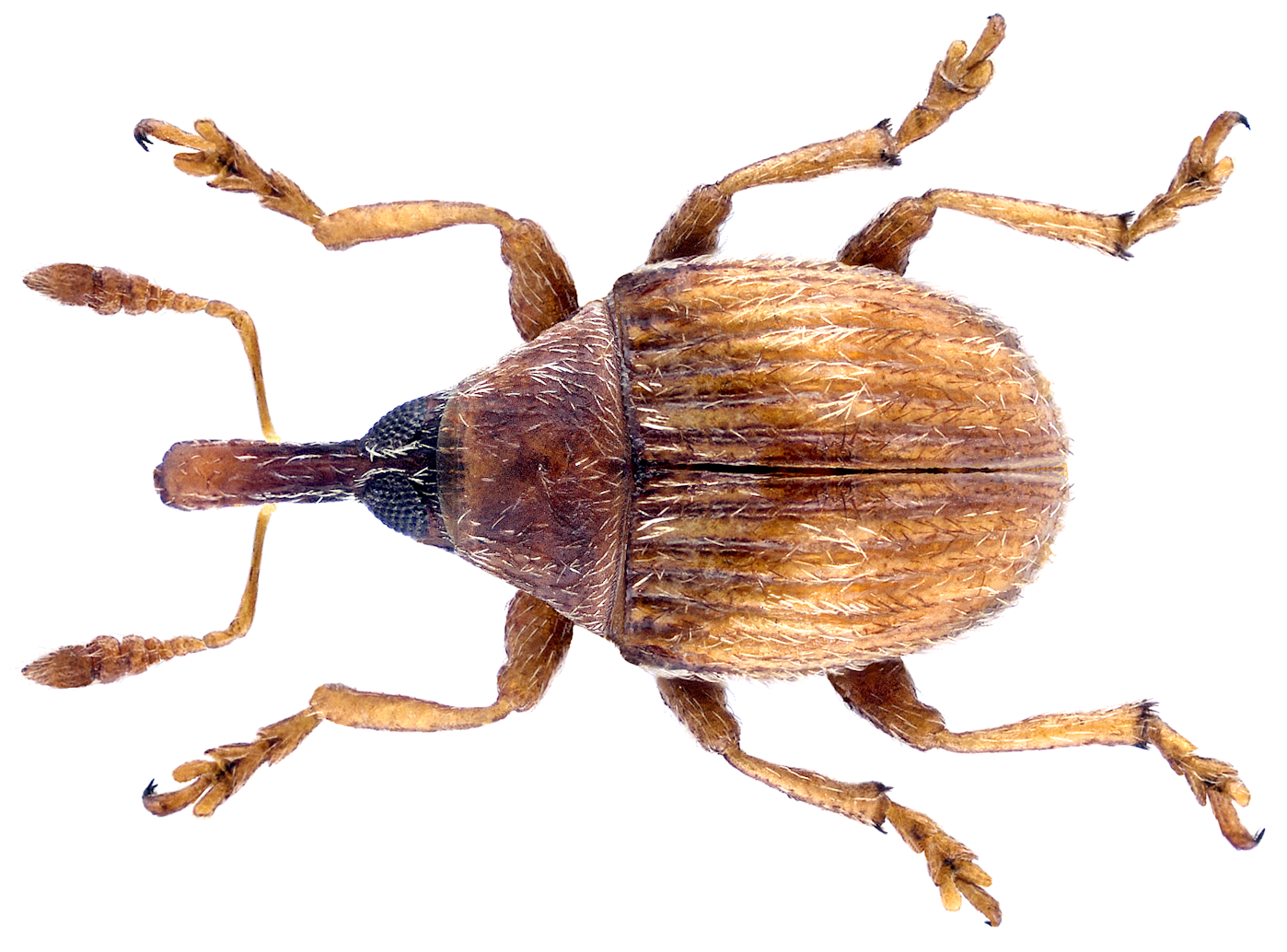
- Nanophyes brevis

Scientific classification
- Kingdom: Animalia
- Phylum: Arthropoda
- Clade: Pancrustacea
- Class: Insecta
- Order: Coleoptera
- Suborder: Polyphaga
- Infraorder: Cucujiformia
- Family: Brentidae
- Subfamily: Nanophyinae; Gistel, 1848

Type genus
- Nanophyes

Tribes
- Corimaliini; Nanophyini

Synonyms
- Nanophyeidae; Nanophyidae

= Nanophyinae =

Subfamily of beetles

Nanophyinae is a subfamily of weevils that belongs to the family Brentidae.

It was originally constructed by Johannes von Nepomuk Franz Xaver Gistel as the family Nanophyeidae in 1848, also spelled Nanophyidae, but has since been reclassified as a subfamily. Its type genus is Nanophyes.

== Taxonomy ==
The subfamily contains two tribes, Corimaliini and Nanophyini.

=== Corimaliini ===
Auth.: Alonso-Zarazaga, 1989

1. Allomalia Alonso-Zarazaga, 1989
2. Corimalia Gozis, 1885
3. Hypophyes Reitter, 1916
4. Titanomalia Alonso-Zarazaga, 1989

=== Nanophyini ===
Auth.: Gistel, 1848

1. Alonsiellus Zherikhin, 1996
2. Amphibolocorynus Schoenherr, 1847
3. Austronanodes Zimmerman, 1993
4. Chibizo Kantoh & Kojima, 2011
5. Ctenomeropsis Voss, 1939
6. Ctenomerus Schoenherr, 1843
7. Damnux Lyal, 2003
8. Dieckmanniellus Alonso-Zarazaga, 1989
9. Diplophyes Marshall, 1933
10. Hexatmetus Marshall, 1927
11. Kantohia Alonso-Zarazaga & Perrin, 2011
12. Lyalia Alonso-Zarazaga & Perrin, 2011
13. Manoja Pajni & Bhateja, 1982
14. Meregallia Alonso-Zarazaga, 1990
15. Microon Alonso-Zarazaga, 1989
16. Nanodactylus Blatchley, 1922
17. Nanodiscus Kiesenwetter, 1864
18. Nanomimus Alonso-Zarazaga, 1989
19. Nanophyes Schönherr, 1838
20. Oxycorax Alonso-Zarazaga, 1990
21. Pericartiellus Alonso-Zarazaga, 1989
22. Prionophyes Alonso-Zarazaga & Lyal, 1999
23. Pseudorobitis L. Redtenbacher, 1868
24. Pseudotychius Blatchley, 1922
25. Shiva (beetle) Pajni & Bhateja, 1982
26. Xenoon Alonso-Zarazaga, 1986
27. Zeugonyx Notman, 1922
28. Zherikhinia Alonso-Zarazaga, 1999

Unplaced genera

1. Indophyes Friedman, 2012
2. Zhangius Wang & Alonso-Zarazaga, 2026
