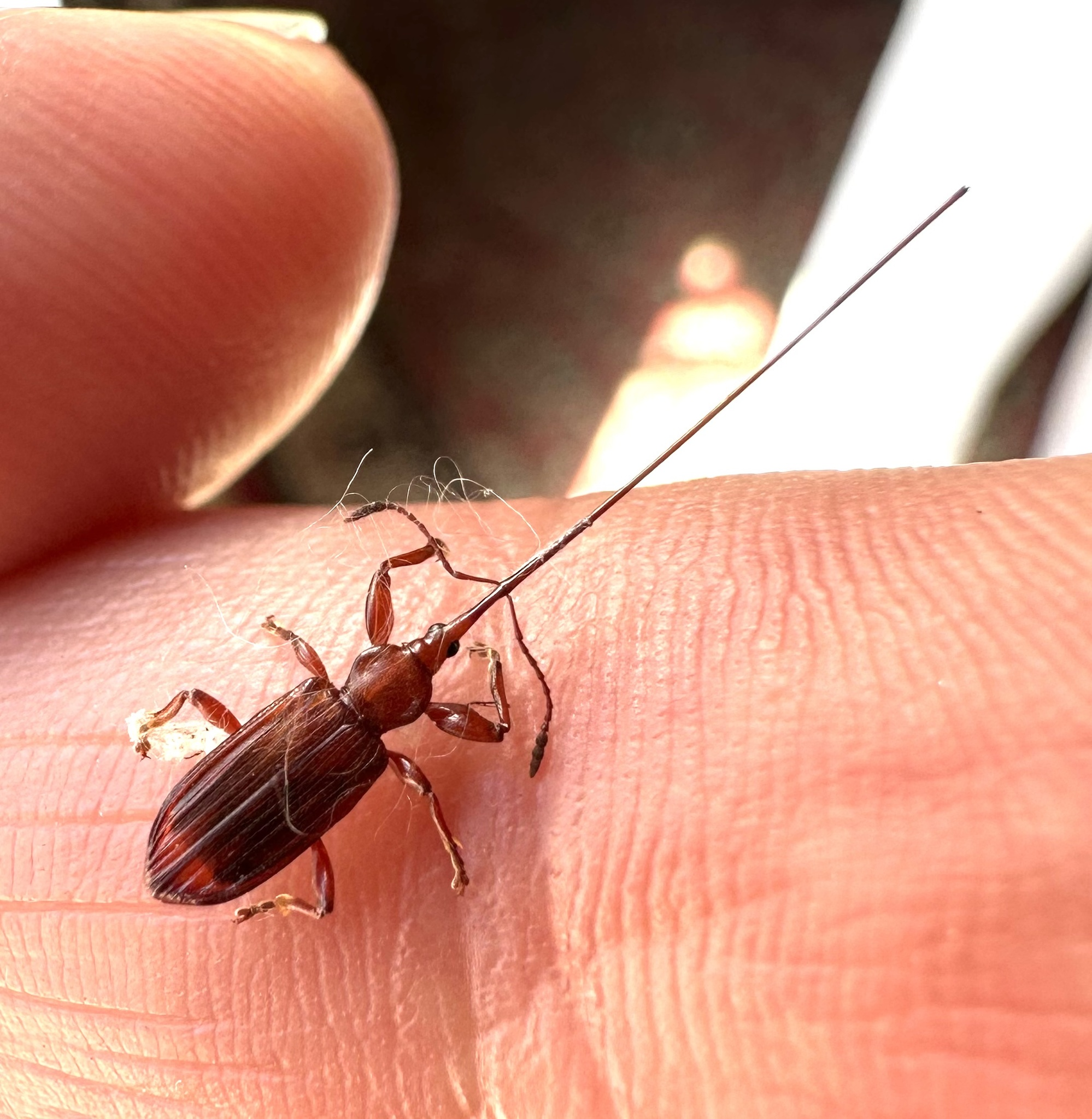
- Female observed near Durbanville in the Western Cape of South Africa.
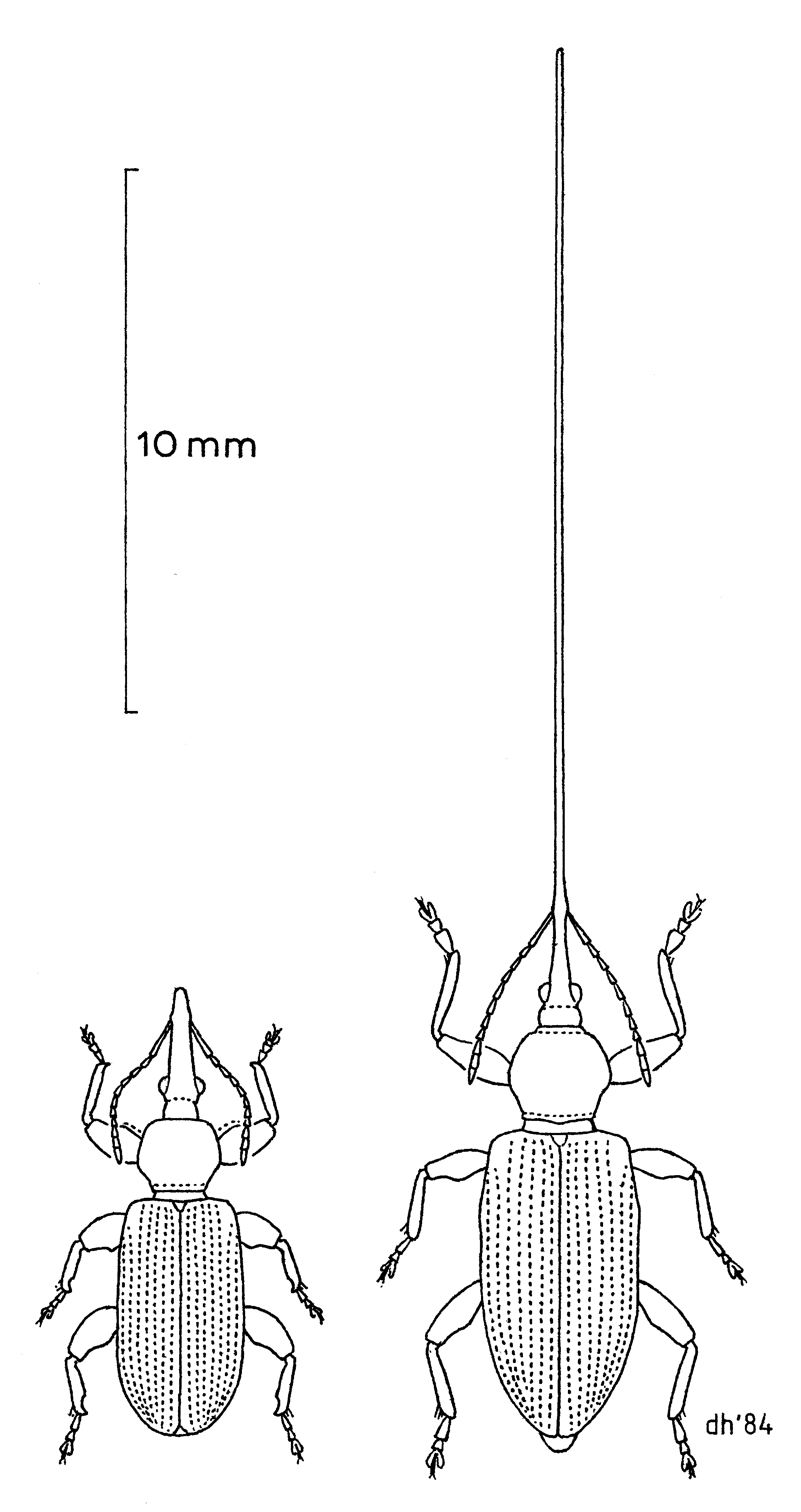
- Male (left) compared to female (right), showing size dimorphism of the snout

Scientific classification
- Kingdom: Animalia
- Phylum: Arthropoda
- Clade: Pancrustacea
- Class: Insecta
- Order: Coleoptera
- Suborder: Polyphaga
- Infraorder: Cucujiformia
- Superfamily: Curculionoidea
- Family: Brentidae
- Genus: Antliarhis
- Species: A. zamiae

Binomial name
- Antliarhis zamiae (Thunberg, 1784)

Synonyms
- Curculio zamiae Thunberg, 1784; Antliarhinus zamiae (Thunberg, 1784) (Note: Antliarhis Billberg, 1820 has priority over Antliarhinus Schoenherr, 1823 per)

= Antliarhis zamiae =

Species of beetle

Antliarhis zamiae is a species of weevil in the family Brentidae. It is native to southern Africa, including South Africa. Like other species of the genus, its hosts are cycads belonging to the genus Encephalartos, with the larvae feeding on the gametophyte (the innermost part) of the seed ovule. The body is relatively flattened, which helps them move around the cycad cone and seek shelter in the crevices of the cone. The females are noted for their extraordinarily long snouts, which are the longest relative to body size of any beetle, being twice the body length, reaching a total length of about 2 centimetres (0.79 in), with a diameter of about 0.1 millimetres (1/250 in), with mouthparts including mandibles at the front of the snout like other weevils. The snout is used to deposit eggs, being able to drill narrow but relatively deep openings in the thick protective outer layers (including the sporophyll) of the cone covering the seeds. The females tend to attempt to drill holes under the cover of darkness, in the junctions between the sporophylls where the armouring is thinnest, resulting in the snout typically penetrating the cone (and the outer layers of the seed) to up the level of the antennae. Drilling generally takes about two hours and 37 minutes, plus or minus an hour. Following the hole being drilled, the female rotates by 180 degrees, and eggs are subsequently deposited into the hole using her ovipositor (which is about 81-93% the length of the snout when fully extended), which takes about half an hour. Not uncommonly when the hole is attempted to be drilled, the snout breaks off, resulting in Encephalartos cones being observed with embedded A. zamiae snouts.

Members of the species play a minor role in pollinating cones of the cycad Encephalartos villosus (which is primarily pollinated by another weevil belonging to the genus Porthetes), though this is minor enough that it does not meaningfully offset the antagonistic relationship between the two species. Predation on the seeds of Encephalartos plants by Antilarhis species, particularly A. zamiae, can significantly affect their reproductive output, destroying up to 90% of a plants seeds in some cases, which is a conservation concern due to all Encephalartos species currently being endangered. The species was originally named as Curculio zamiae in 1784 by Carl Peter Thunberg, based on specimens he had collected on a voyage to South Africa in the 1770s.

Antliarhis zamiae on a Encephalartos cone
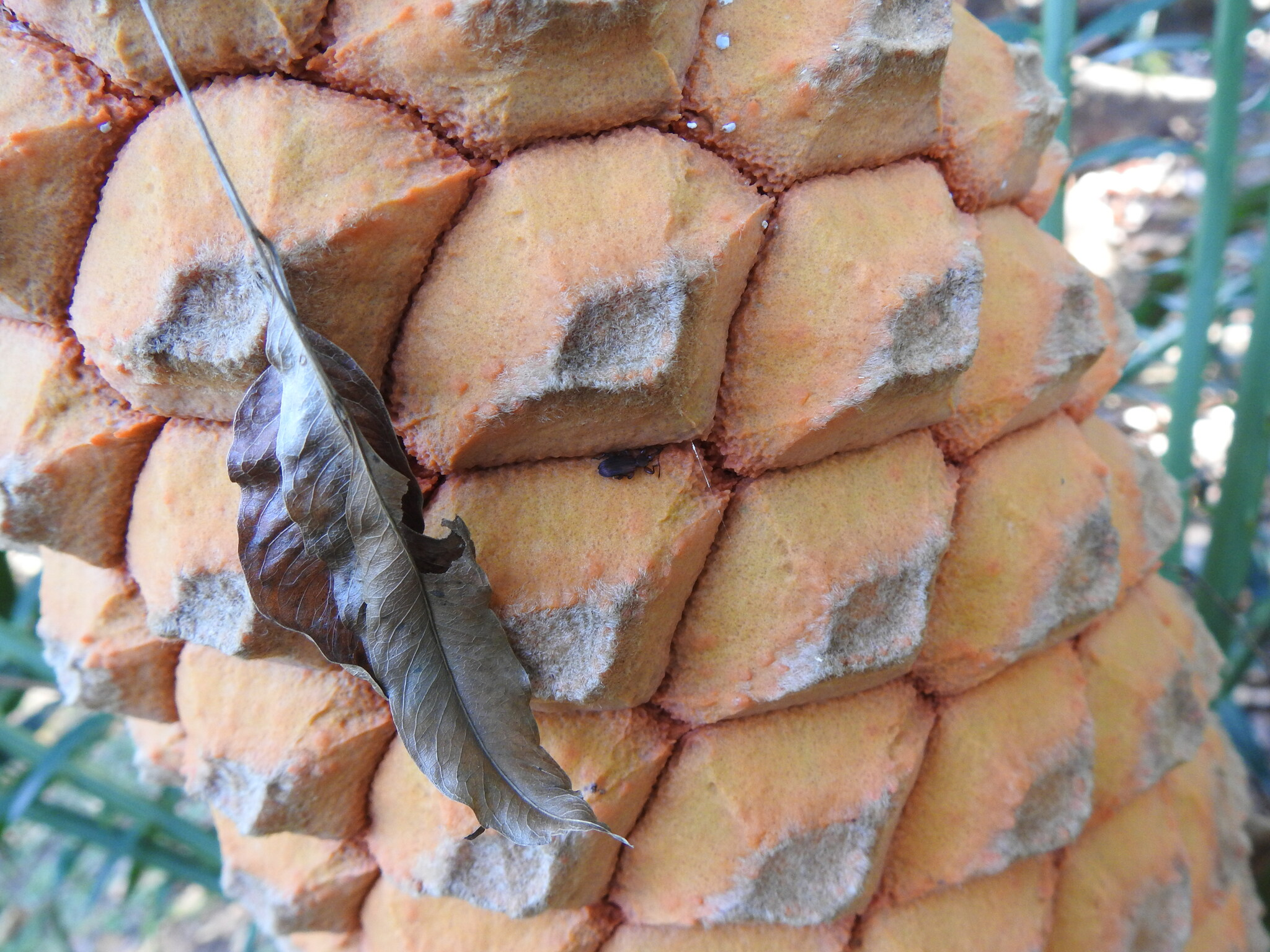
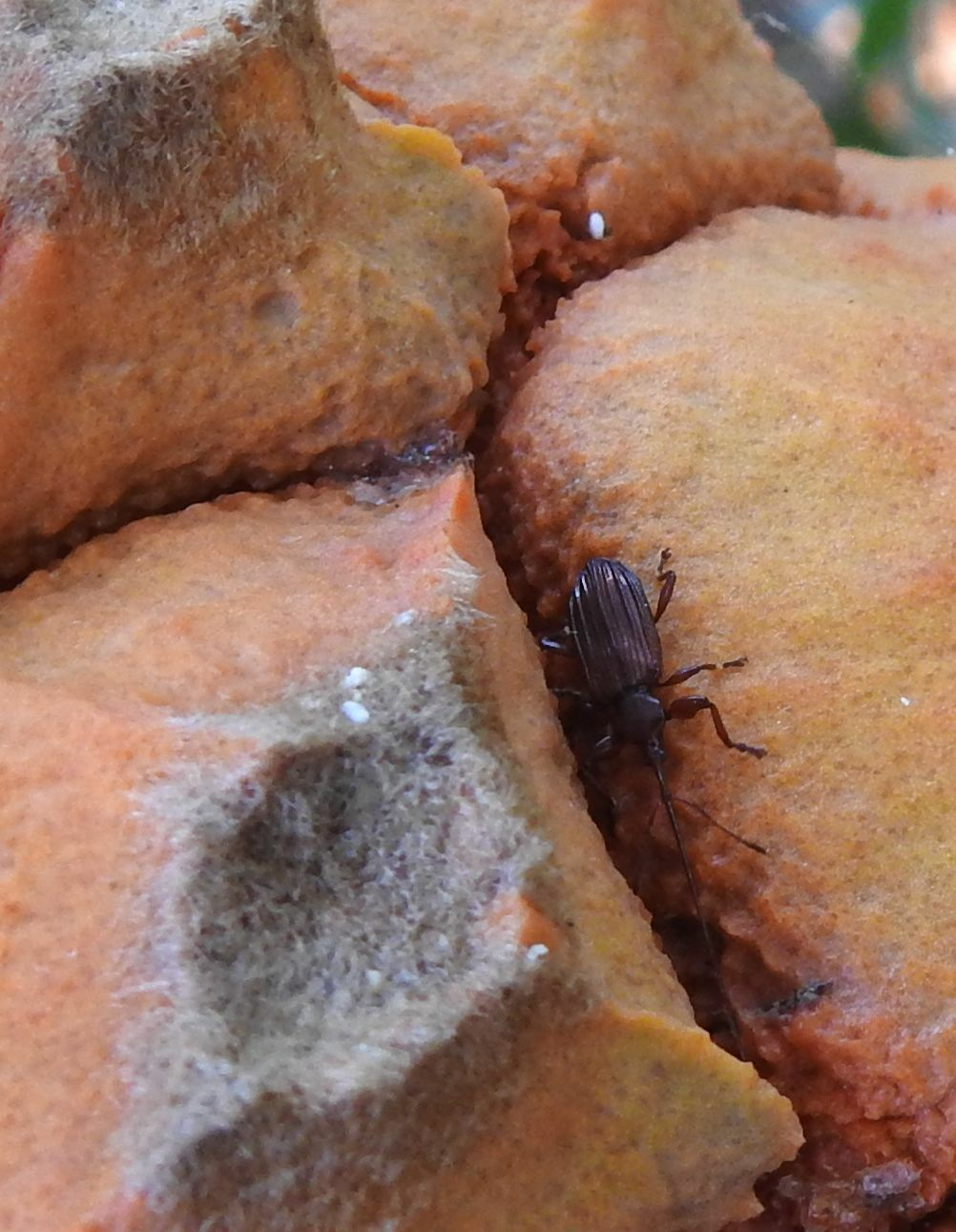
