= Car (beetle) =

Scientific classification
- Kingdom: Animalia
- Phylum: Arthropoda
- Clade: Pancrustacea
- Class: Insecta
- Order: Coleoptera
- Suborder: Polyphaga
- Infraorder: Cucujiformia
- Family: Caridae
- Genus: Car; T.Blackburn, 1897

Genus of weevils

Car is a genus of weevils belonging to the family Caridae. It was first described by Australian entomologist, Thomas Blackburn in 1897.

Car is the only genus in the family Caridae. There are four known species:

- Car condensatus Blackb., 1897
- Car cylindrirostris Voss, 1932
- Car intermedius Lea, 1926
- Car pini Lea, 1911
