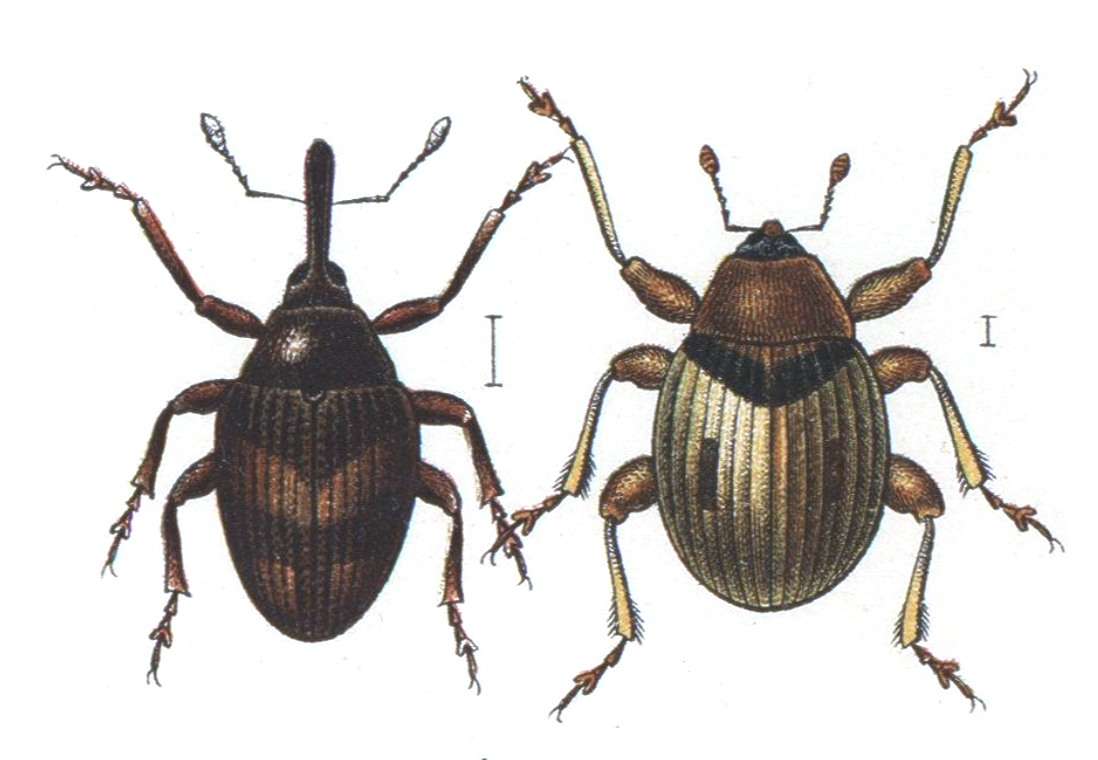
- N. lythri and N. pallidulus

Scientific classification
- Kingdom: Animalia
- Phylum: Arthropoda
- Clade: Pancrustacea
- Class: Insecta
- Order: Coleoptera
- Suborder: Polyphaga
- Infraorder: Cucujiformia
- Family: Brentidae
- Tribe: Nanophyini
- Genus: Nanophyes; Schönherr, 1838

= Nanophyes =

Genus of beetles

Nanophyes is a genus of beetles belonging to the family Brentidae.

The species of this genus are found in Europe, Japan and Southern Africa.

== Selected species ==
- Nanophyes brevis Boheman, 1845
- Nanophyes chibizo Kono, 1930
- Nanophyes globiformis (Kiesenwetter, 1864)
- Nanophyes poecilopterus H.Brisout, 1869
- Nanophyes rubricus Rosenhauer, 1856
