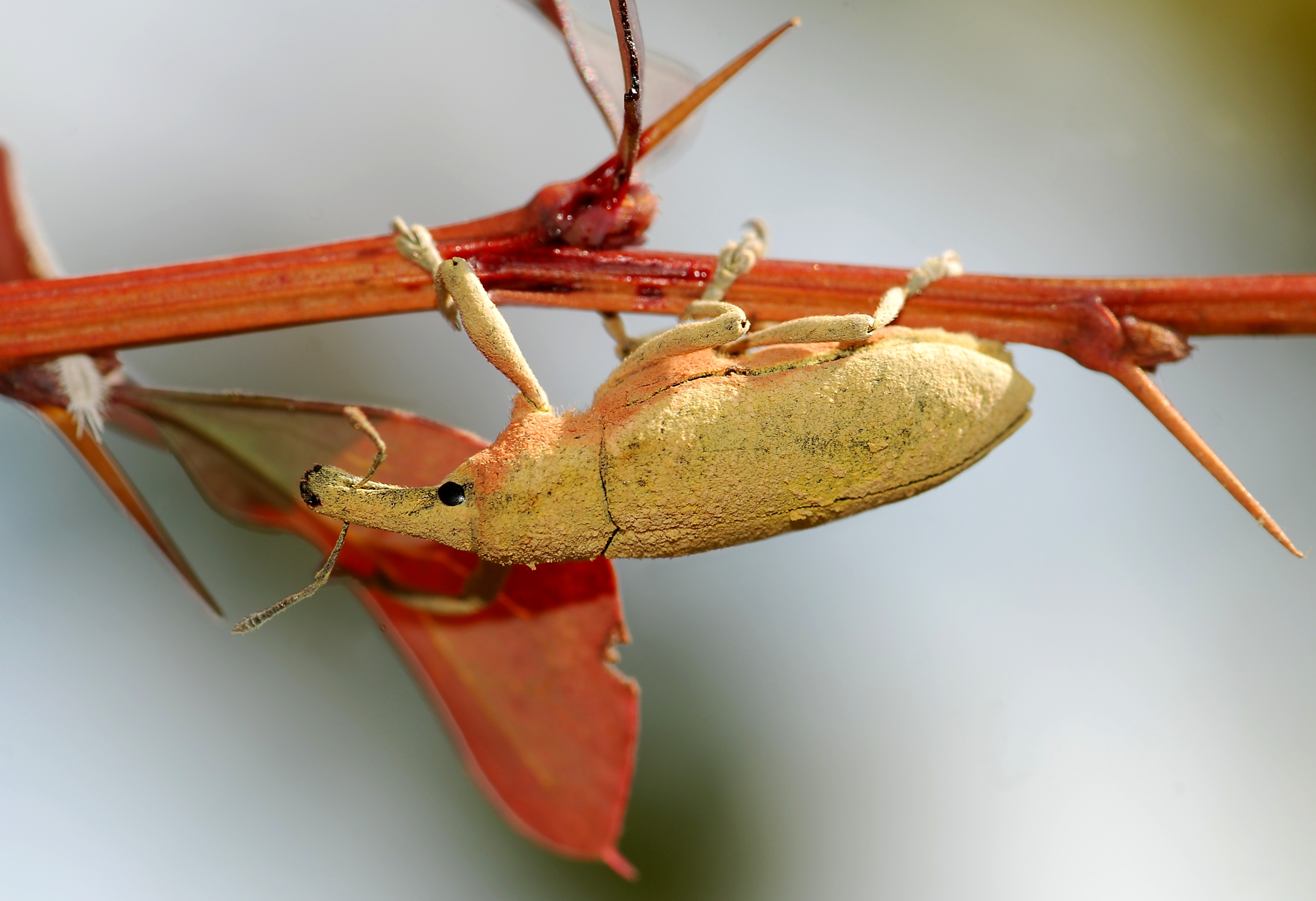
- Lixus pulverulentus

Scientific classification
- Kingdom: Animalia
- Phylum: Arthropoda
- Clade: Pancrustacea
- Class: Insecta
- Order: Coleoptera
- Suborder: Polyphaga
- Infraorder: Cucujiformia
- Clade: Phytophaga
- Superfamily: Curculionoidea; Latreille, 1802

Families
- Anthribidae; Attelabidae; Belidae; Brentidae; Caridae; Cimberididae; Curculionidae; †Mesophyletidae; Nemonychidae; †?Obrieniidae

= Weevil =

Weevils Temporal range: Middle Jurassic - Recent

Superfamily of beetles

Weevils are beetles belonging to the superfamily Curculionoidea, known for their very long snouts. They are usually small – less than 6 mm (1/4 in) in length – and herbivorous. Approximately 97,000 species of weevils are known. They belong to several families, with most of them in the family Curculionidae (the true weevils). It also includes bark beetles, which while morphologically dissimilar to other weevils in lacking the distinctive snout, is a subfamily of Curculionidae. Some other beetles, although not closely related, bear the name "weevil", such as the leaf beetle subfamily Bruchinae, known as "bean weevils", or the biscuit weevil (Stegobium paniceum), which belongs to the family Ptinidae.

Many weevils are considered pests because of their ability to damage and kill crops. The grain or wheat weevil (Sitophilus granarius) damages stored grain, as does the maize weevil (Sitophilus zeamais), among others. The boll weevil (Anthonomus grandis) attacks cotton crops; it lays its eggs inside cotton bolls and the larvae eat their way out. Other weevils are used for biological control of invasive plants.

A weevil's rostrum, or elongated snout, hosts chewing mouthparts instead of the piercing mouthparts that proboscis-possessing insects are known for. The mouthparts are often used to excavate tunnels into grains. In more derived weevils, the rostrum has a groove in which the weevil can fold the first segment of its antennae.

Most weevils have the ability to fly (including pest species such as the rice weevil), though a significant number are flightless, such as the genus Otiorhynchus, and others can jump.

One species of weevil, Austroplatypus incompertus, exhibits eusociality, one of the few insects outside the Hymenoptera and the Isoptera to do so.

== Description ==
Weevil anatomy

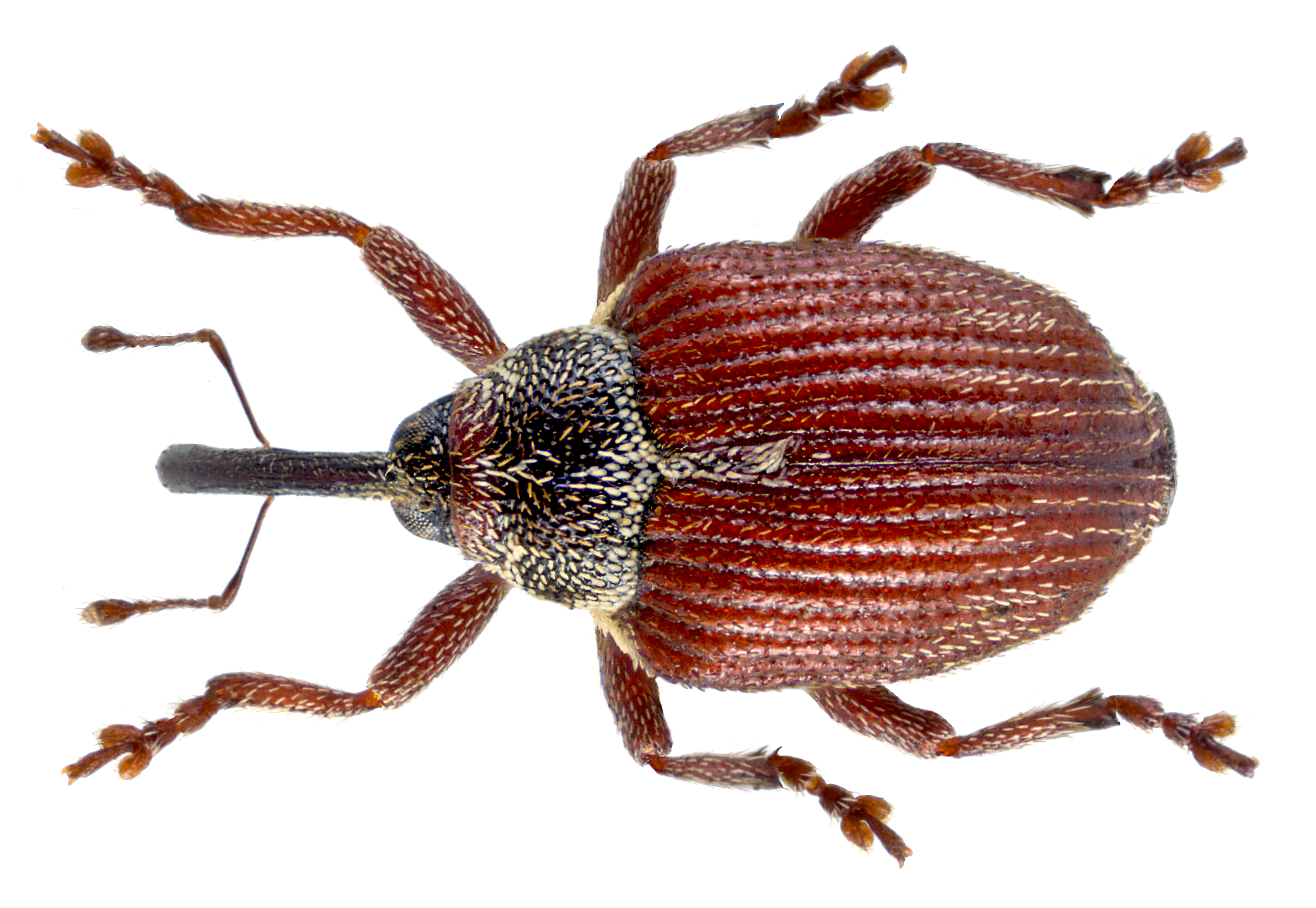
Specimen of Coeliodinus rubicundus (Curculionidae) in top-down view

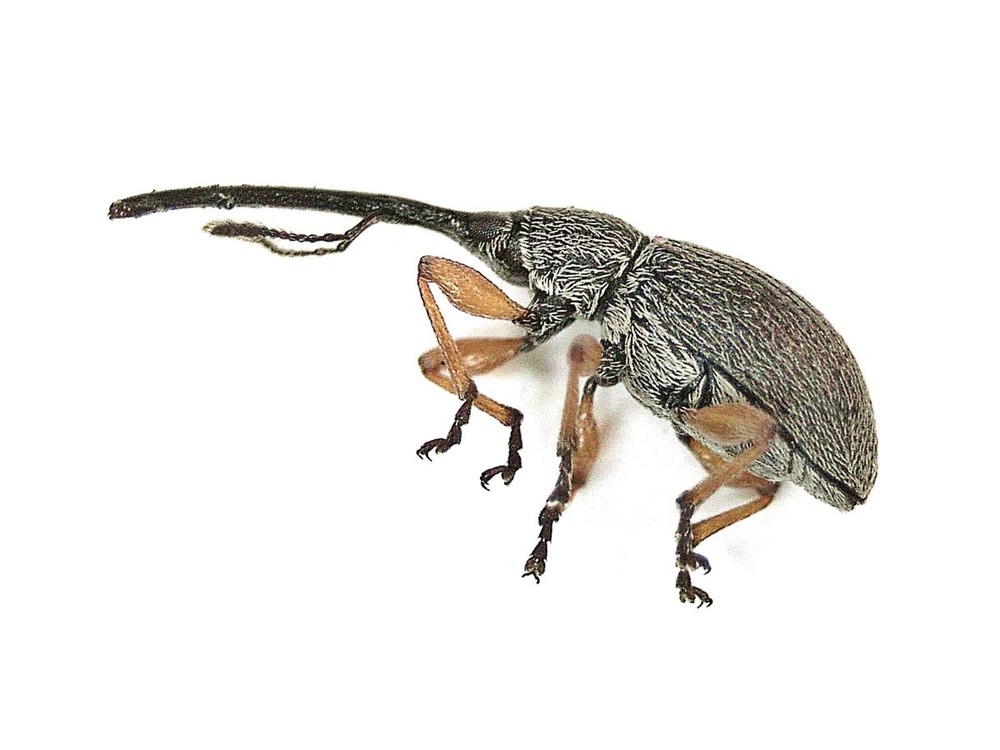
Rhopalapion longirostre (Brentidae) in side-on view

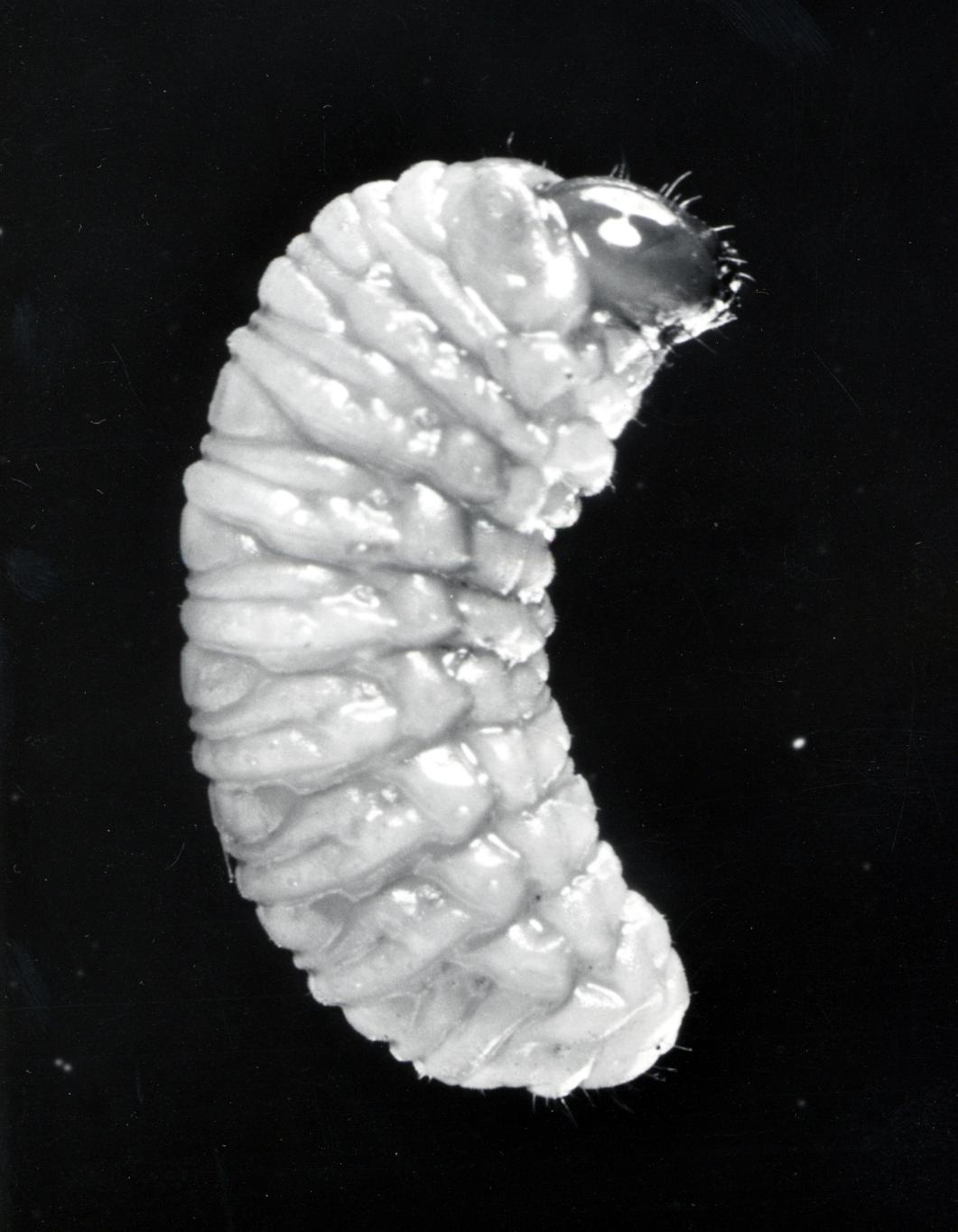
Larva of the Sitka spruce weevil (Pissodes sitchensis)

Weevils are characterised by their distinctive (typically) elongate rostrums, that in some taxa reaches or exceeds the length of the body, though in other weevils is relatively short. The mouthparts including the mandibles are located at the tip of the rostrum. This rostrum primarily serves as for oviposition, being used to bore deep holes in plant tissues that the ovipositor is subsequently inserted into to lay eggs. The antennae are generally attached towards the front of the rostrum. The elytra (the hard shell covering the wings) are generally punctured with small holes that run in striae (rows) along the length of the body, with generally around 10 striae per elytron. The aedeagus (penis) is generally cylindrical. The larvae of weevils are soft bodied, lacking or only having vestigial legs, and generally slightly curved, though some weevil larvae have significant curvature. The head of the larvae is well sclerotised with well developed mandibles, with a downward facing mouth. The body of the weevil larvae is made up of a thorax with three segments and a posterior abdomen with 10 segments, most of which have spiracles allowing the larvae to breathe.

== Ecology ==
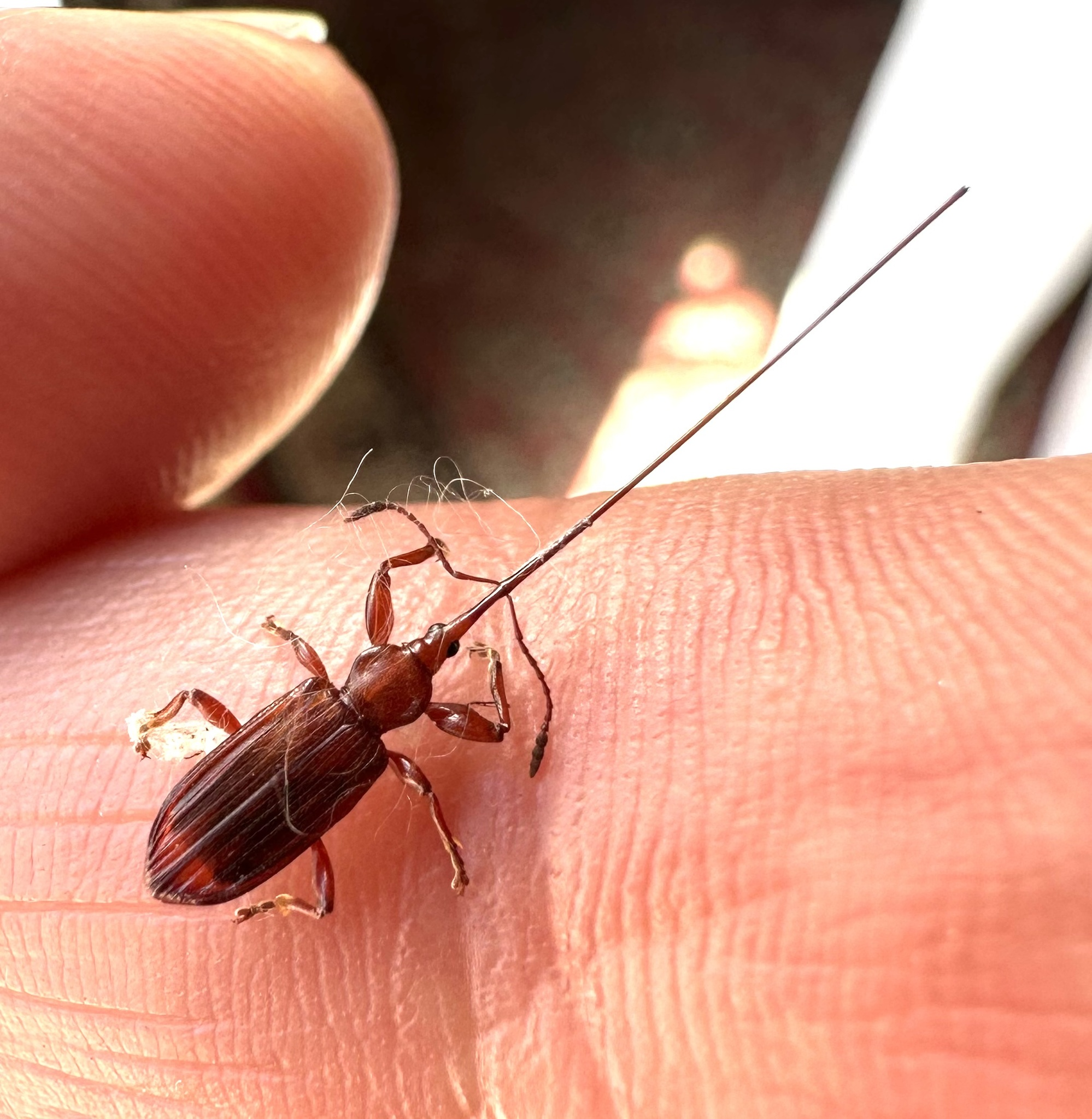
Female of Antliarhis zamiae (Brentidae), which have the proportionally longest known snouts among weevils

Larval weevils largely live inside plant tissues, feeding on dying, stressed and/or diseased plants, though some larvae have more specialized lifestyles such as those of Tentegia, which feed on dung. Weevils feed on all types of plant tissue. Most weevils target flowering plants, though the most primitive living weevils target conifers, suggesting that they were the ancestral host. Some weevils have adapted to specialised ecologies such as myrmecophily (living alongside ants), predatory and parasitic lifestyles.

== Taxonomy and phylogeny ==
Members of various weevil families

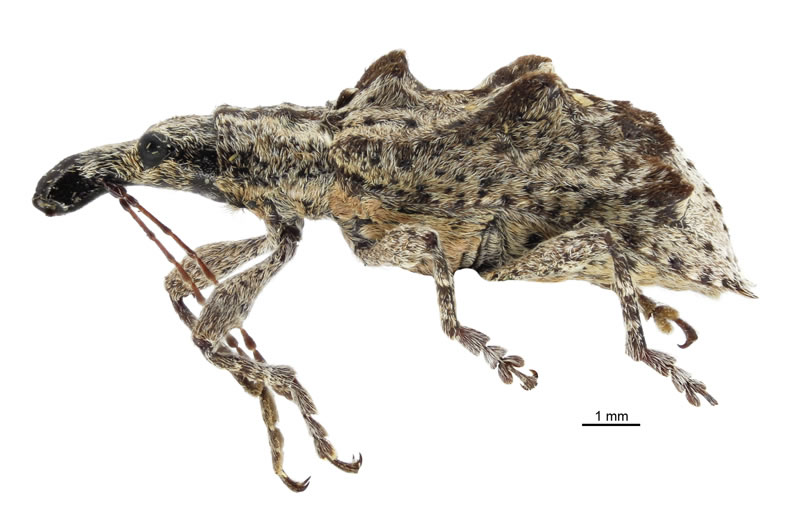
Agathinus tridens (Belidae)

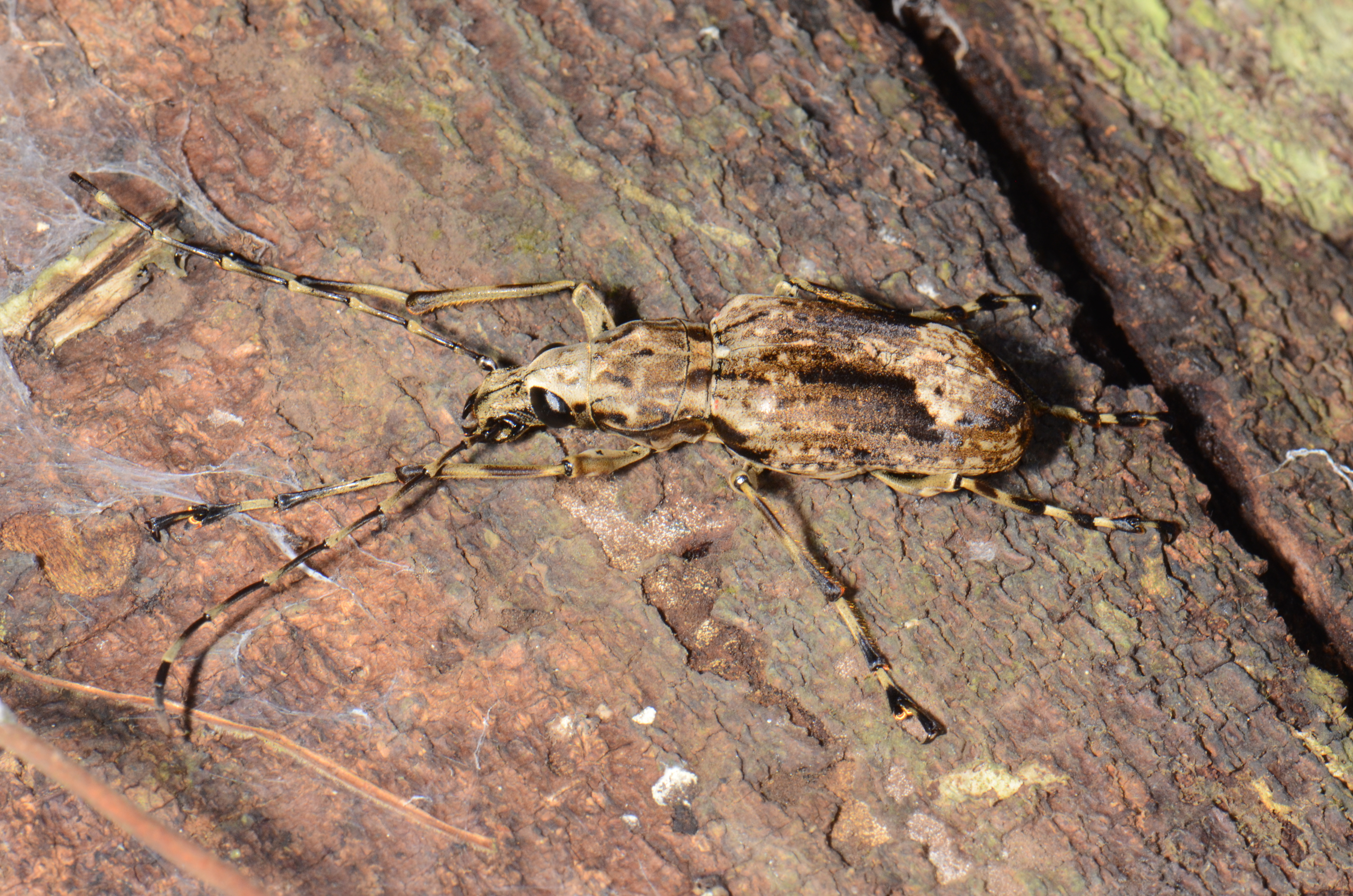
Eugigas goliathus (Anthribidae)

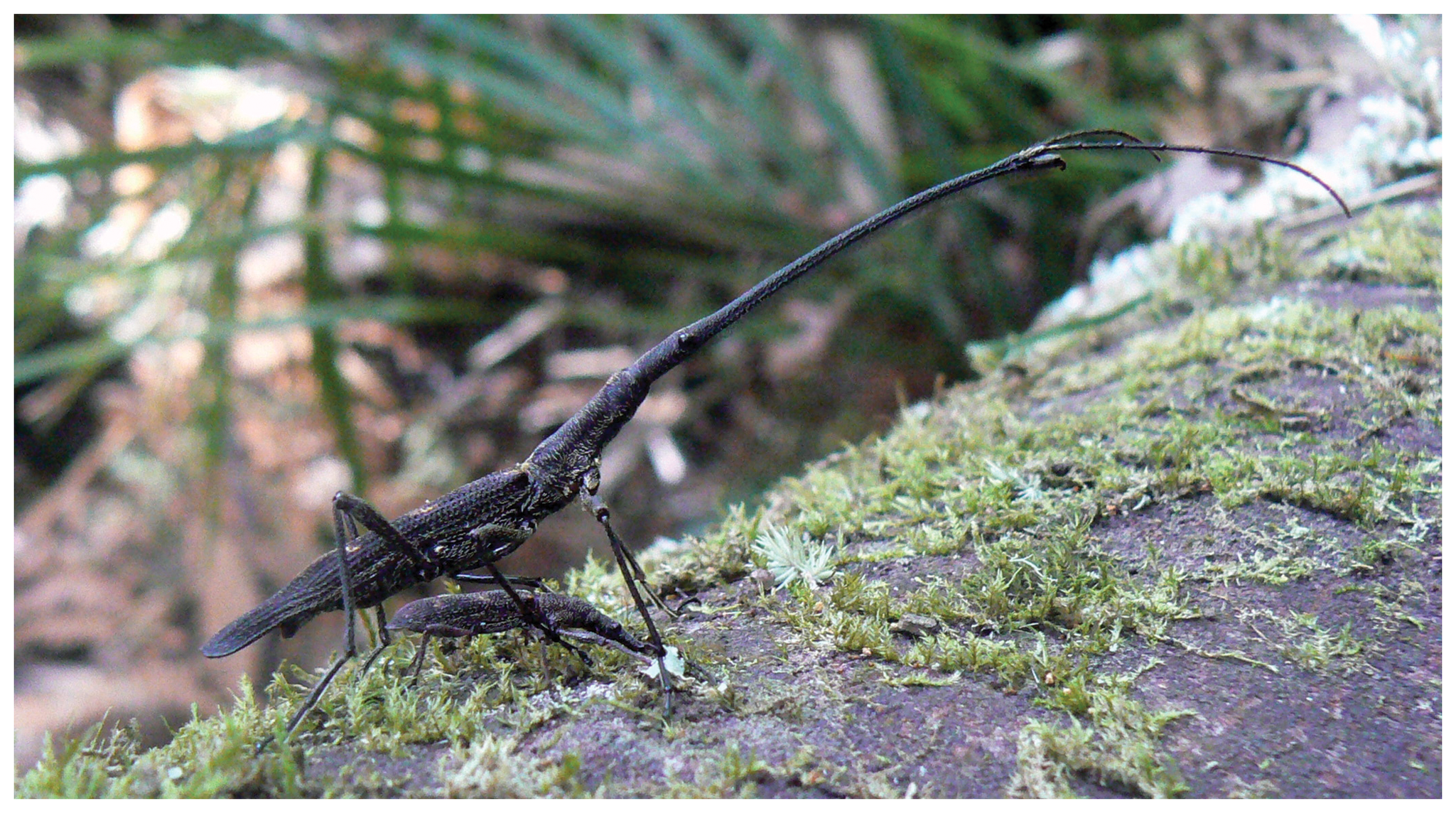
New Zealand giraffe weevil Lasiorhynchus barbicornis (Brentidae)

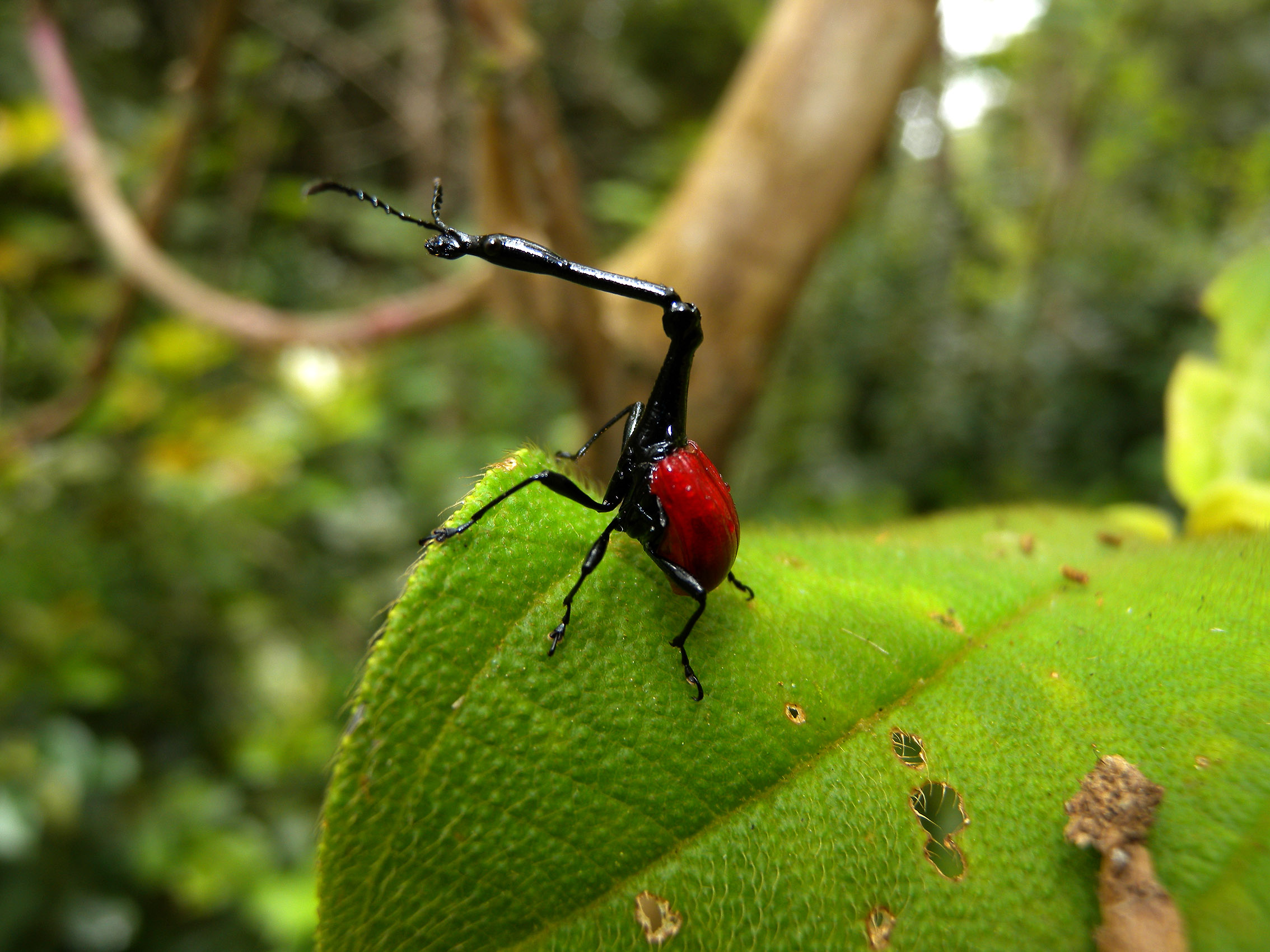
Giraffe weevil Trachelophorus giraffa (Attelabidae)

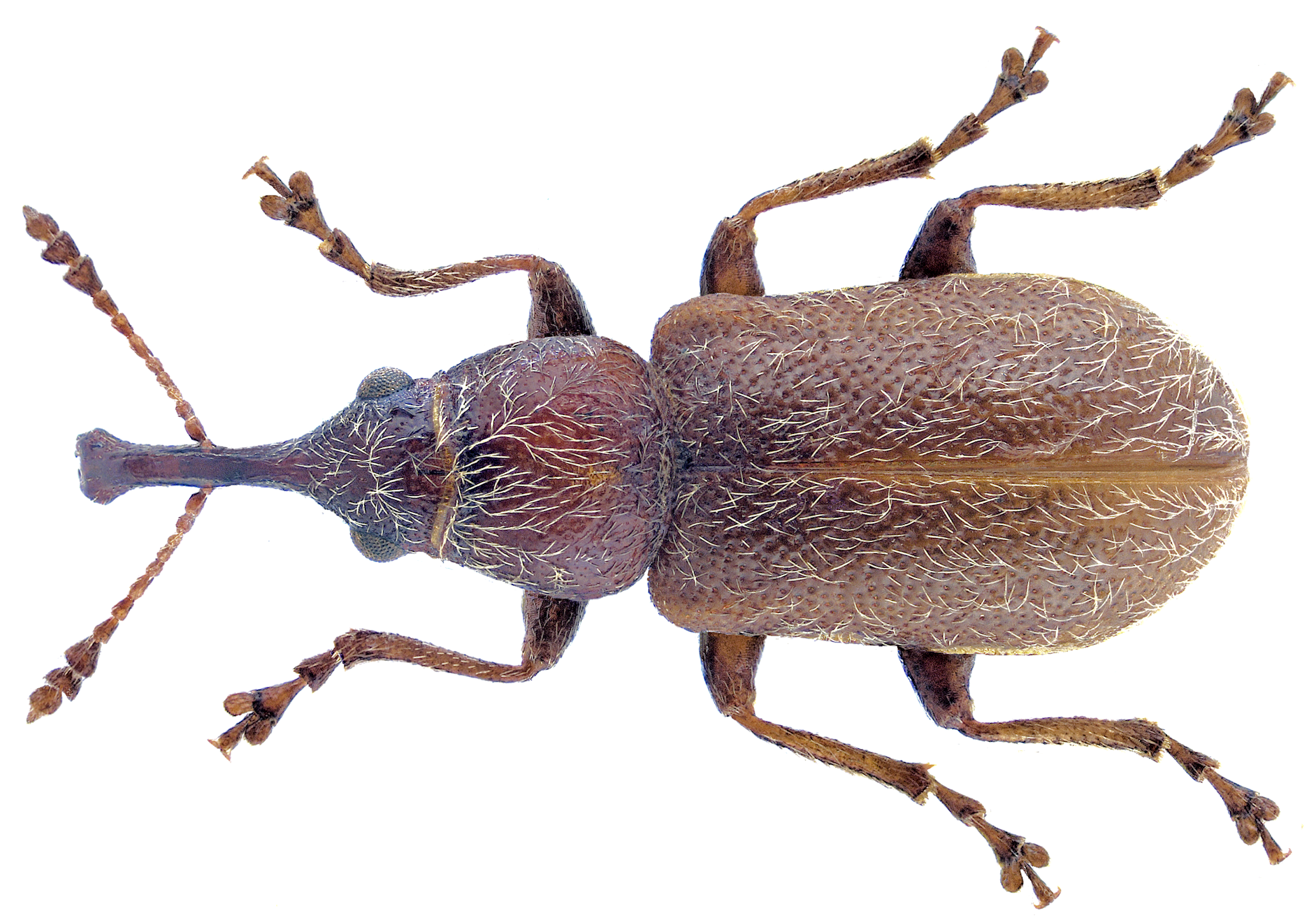
(Doydirhynchus austriacus Nemonychidae/Cimberididae)

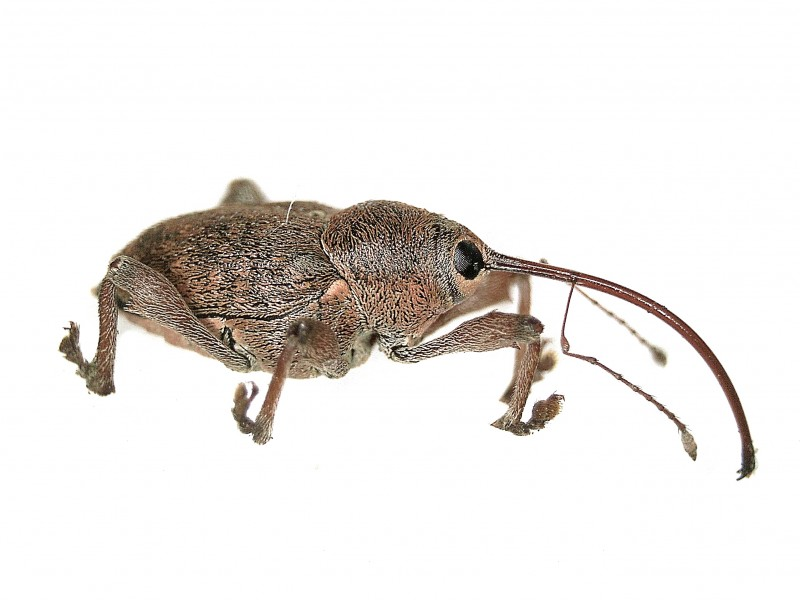
Acorn weevil Curculio glandium (Curculionidae)

Because so many species exist in such diversity, the higher classification of weevils is in a state of flux. They are generally divided into two major divisions, the Orthoceri or primitive weevils, and the Gonatoceri or true weevils (Curculionidae). E. C. Zimmerman proposed a third division, the Heteromorphi, for several intermediate forms. Primitive weevils are distinguished by having straight antennae, while true weevils have elbowed (geniculate) antennae. The elbow occurs at the end of the scape (first antennal segment) in true weevils, and the scape is usually much longer than the other antennal segments. Some exceptions occur, such as Nanophyini, primitive weevils with long scapes and geniculate antennae, while among the true weevils, Gonipterinae and Ramphus have short scapes and little or no "elbow".

A 1995 classification system to family level was provided by Kuschel, with updates from Marvaldi et al. in 2002, and was achieved using phylogenetic analyses. The accepted families were the primitive weevils, Anthribidae, Attelabidae, Belidae, Brentidae, Caridae, and Nemonychidae, and the true weevils Curculionidae. Most other weevil families were demoted to subfamilies or tribes. Further work resulted in the elevation of Cimberididae to family from placement as a subfamily of Nemonychidae in 2017 and the recognition of the Cretaceous age family Mesophyletidae in 2018 from Burmese amber. The oldest weevils date to the Middle-Late Jurassic boundary, found in the Karabastau Formation of Kazakhstan, the Shar-Teg locality of Mongolia, the Daohugou locality in Inner Mongolia, China, and the Talbragar site in Australia. The extinct family Obrieniidae, with species dating from the Ladinian stage of the Triassic through to tentatively the Oxfordian, have sometimes been considered weevils. Genera of the family have only been found in three formations in Kazakhstan, with most named in 1993. However, their phylogenetic position is contested, with others considering it part of Archostemata.

The interfamilial relationships of Curculionoidea have been generally well resolved. The phylogeny by Li et al. (2023) based on phylogenomic data is suggested below:

- - Cimberididae
  - - - Nemonychidae
      - Anthribidae
    - - Belidae
      - - Attelabidae
        - - Caridae
          - - Brentidae
            - Curculionidae

== Families ==
- Anthribidae—fungus weevils
- Attelabidae—leaf rolling weevils
- Belidae—primitive weevils
- Brentidae—straight snout weevils
- Caridae
- Cimberididae
- Curculionidae—true weevils
- †Mesophyletidae
- Nemonychidae—pine flower weevils
- †?Obrieniidae

== Sexual dimorphism ==
Rhopalapion longirostre exhibits an extreme case of sexual dimorphism. The female rostrum is twice as long and its surface is smoother than in the male. The female bores egg channels into the buds of Alcea rosea. Thus, the dimorphism is not attributed to sexual selection. It is a response to ecological demands of egg deposition.

Another example of extreme dimorphism in weevils is that of the New Zealand giraffe weevil. Males measure up to 90 mm (3.5 in) and females 50 mm (2.0 in), although there is an extreme range of body sizes in both sexes.
