= List of Trachelizinae genera =

This is a list of 110 genera in Trachelizinae, a subfamily of primitive weevils in the family Brentidae.

== Trachelizinae genera ==
- Achrionota Pascoe, 1872^{i c g}
- Acratus Lacordaire, 1865^{i c g}
- Agrioblepis Kleine, 1921^{i c g}
- Allodapinus Hedicke, 1923^{i c g}
- Amerismus Lacordaire, 1865^{i c g}
- Anactorus Damoiseau, 1967^{i c g}
- Anampyx Damoiseau, 1963^{i c g}
- Anchisteus Kolbe, 1883^{i c g}
- Aneorhachis Kleine, 1923^{i c g}
- Anocamara Kleine, 1920^{i c g}
- Aphelampyx Quentin, 1966^{i c g}
- Araiorrhinus Senna, 1893^{i c g}
- Atenophthalmus Kleine, 1920^{i c g}
- Autarcus Senna, 1892^{i c g}
- Belorhynchus Berthold, 1827^{i c g}
- Bothriorhinus Fairmaire, 1881^{i c g}
- Bulbogaster Lacordaire, 1865^{i c g}
- Cacoschizus Sharp, 1900^{i c g}
- Calyptulus Kleine, 1922^{i c g}
- Ceocephalus Guérin-Méneville, 1833^{i c g}
- Chalybdicus Kleine, 1922^{i c g}
- Dacetellum Hedicke, 1922^{i c g}
- Entomopisthius De Muizon, 1959^{i c g}
- Eterodiurus Senna, 1911^{i c g}
- Eubactrus Lacordaire, 1865^{i c g}
- Eumecopodus Calabresi, 1920^{i c g}
- Euschizus Kleine, 1922^{i c g}
- Fonteboanius Senna, 1893^{i c g}
- Gynandrorhynchus Lacordaire, 1865^{i c g}
- Hemisamblus Kleine, 1925^{i c g}
- Hephebocerus Schoenherr, 1840^{i c g}
- Hetaeroceocephalus Kleine, 1921^{i c g}
- Heterothesis Kleine, 1914^{i c g}
- Higonius Lewis, 1883^{i c g}
- Homophylus Kleine, 1920^{i c g}
- Hormocerus Schoenherr, 1823^{i c g}
- Hovasius Senna, 1895^{i c g}
- Howeius Mantilleri, 2011^{i c g}
- Hypomiolispa Kleine, 1918^{i c g}
- Hypotrachelizus Kleine, 1933^{i c g}
- Ischnomerus Labram and Imhoff, 1838^{i c g}
- Ischyromerus Labram and Imhoff, 1838^{i c g}
- Isoceocephalus Kleine, 1920^{i c g}
- Ithystenomorphus Kleine, 1919^{i c g}
- Ithystenus Pascoe, 1862^{i c g}
- Kolbrentus Alonso-Zarazaga, Lyal, Bartolozzi and Sforzi, 1999^{i c g}
- Lasiorhynchus Lacordaire, 1865^{i c g}
- Leptocymatium Kleine, 1922^{i c g}
- Leptomiolispa Kleine, 1933^{i c g}
- Mesetia Blackburn, 1896^{i c g}
- Metatrachelus Kleine, 1925^{i c g}
- Microtrachelizus Senna, 1893^{i c g}
- Miolispa Pascoe, 1862^{i c g}
- Miolispoides Senna, 1894^{i c g}
- Neacratus Alonso-Zarazaga, Lyal, Bartolozzi and Sforzi, 1999^{i c g}
- Nemobrenthus Sharp, 1895^{i c g}
- Nemocephalinus Kleine, 1927^{i c g}
- Nemocephalus Guérin-Méneville, 1827^{i c g}
- Nemocoryna Sharp, 1895^{i c g}
- Nemorhinus Schoenherr, 1823^{i c g}
- Neohigonius Goossens, 2005^{i c g}
- Neomygaleicus De Muizon, 1960^{i c g}
- Nothogaster Lacordaire, 1865^{i c g}
- Odontelytron Sforzi and Mantilleri, 2007^{i c g}
- Oxyscapanus Damoiseau, 1989^{i c g}
- Ozodecerus Chevrolat, 1839^{i c g}
- Palaeoceocephalus Kleine, 1920^{i c g}
- Paraceocephalus Kleine, 1944^{i c g}
- Parapisthius Kleine, 1935^{i c g}
- Paratrachelizus Kleine, 1921^{i c g b}
- Paryphobrenthus Kolbe, 1897^{i c g}
- Peraprophthalmus Kleine, 1923^{i c g}
- Periceocephalus Kleine, 1922^{i c g}
- Peritrachelizus Kleine, 1922^{i c g}
- Perroudia Damoiseau, 1962^{i c g}
- Phacecerus Schoenherr, 1840^{i c g}
- Phocylides Pascoe, 1872^{i c g}
- Piazocnemis Lacordaire, 1865^{i c g}
- Pithoderes Calabresi, 1920^{i c g}
- Plesiophocylides Kleine, 1925^{i c g}
- Prodector Pascoe, 1862^{i c g}
- Proephebocerus Calabresi, 1920^{i c g}
- Proteramocerus Kleine, 1921^{i c g}
- Pseudoceocephalus Kleine, 1920^{i c g}
- Pseudohigonius Damoiseau, 1987^{i c g}
- Pseudomygaleicus De Muizon, 1960^{i c g}
- Pseudophocylides Kleine, 1920^{i c g}
- Pterygostomus Lacordaire, 1865^{i c g}
- Pyresthema Kleine, 1922^{i c g}
- Rhinopteryx Lacordaire, 1865^{i c g}
- Schizephebocerus Kleine, 1923^{i c g}
- Schizotrachelus Lacordaire, 1865^{i c g}
- Schizuropterus Kleine, 1925^{i c g}
- Sclerotrachelus Kleine, 1921^{i c g}
- Sennaiella Alonso-Zarazaga, Lyal, Bartolozzi and Sforzi, 1999^{i c g}
- Stenobrentus Damoiseau, 1966^{i c g}
- Storeosomus Lacordaire, 1865^{i c g}
- Stroggylosternum Kleine, 1922^{i c g}
- Syggenithystenus Kleine, 1919^{i c g}
- Temnolaimus Chevrolat, 1839^{i c g}
- Teramocerus Schoenherr, 1840^{i c g}
- Thaumastopsis Kleine, 1921^{i c g}
- Thoracobrenthus Damoiseau, 1961^{i c g}
- Trachelizus Dejean, 1834^{i c g}
- Tracheloschizus Damoiseau, 1966^{i c g}
- Tulotus Senna, 1894^{i c g}
- Uroptera Berthold, 1827^{i c g}
- Uropteroides Kleine, 1922^{i c g}
- Vasseletia Sharp, 1895^{i c g}
- Zetophloeus Lacordaire, 1865^{i c g}

Data sources: i = ITIS, c = Catalogue of Life, g = GBIF, b = Bugguide.net
