= Coptorhynchus =

Scientific classification
- Kingdom: Animalia
- Phylum: Arthropoda
- Class: Insecta
- Order: Coleoptera
- Suborder: Polyphaga
- Infraorder: Cucujiformia
- Family: Curculionidae
- Tribe: Celeuthetini
- Genus: Coptorhynchus; Guerin-Meneville, 1841

Species
- Many, including: Coptorhynchus elegans

Synonyms
- Stereogastrus (Marshall, 1956)

Genus of beetles

Coptorhynchus is a genus of weevils in the tribe Celeuthetini. Species are found in South-East Asia.

Coptorhynchus Desbrochers, 1892 is a junior homonym, and a synonym for Ithystenus.
