= Pseudoceocephalini =

Scientific classification
- Domain: Eukaryota
- Kingdom: Animalia
- Phylum: Arthropoda
- Class: Insecta
- Order: Coleoptera
- Suborder: Polyphaga
- Infraorder: Cucujiformia
- Family: Brentidae
- Subfamily: Trachelizinae
- Tribe: Pseudoceocephalini; Kleine, 1922

Tribe of beetles

Pseudoceocephalini is a tribe of primitive weevils in the family of beetles known as Brentidae. There are at least 40 genera and 150 described species in Pseudoceocephalini.

== Genera ==
These 48 genera belong to the tribe Pseudoceocephalini:

- Agrioblepis Kleine, 1921^{i c g}
- Amerismus Lacordaire, 1865^{i c g}
- Anactorus Damoiseau, 1967^{i c g}
- Anampyx Damoiseau, 1963^{i c g}
- Aphelampyx Quentin, 1966^{i c g}
- Atenophthalmus Kleine, 1920^{i c g}
- Autarcus Senna, 1892^{i c g}
- Cacoschizus Sharp, 1900^{i c g}
- Calyptulus Kleine, 1922^{i c g}
- Chalybdicus Kleine, 1922^{i c g}
- Dacetellum Hedicke, 1922^{i c g}
- Eubactrus Lacordaire, 1865^{i c g}
- Eumecopodus Calabresi, 1920^{i c g}
- Gynandrorhynchus Lacordaire, 1865^{i c g}
- Hetaeroceocephalus Kleine, 1921^{i c g}
- Heterothesis Kleine, 1914^{i c g}
- Hormocerus Schoenherr, 1823^{i c g}
- Isoceocephalus Kleine, 1920^{i c g}
- Metatrachelus Kleine, 1925^{i c g}
- Neomygaleicus De Muizon, 1960^{i c g}
- Nothogaster Lacordaire, 1865^{i c g}
- Oxyscapanus Damoiseau, 1989^{i c g}
- Palaeoceocephalus Kleine, 1920^{i c g}
- Paraceocephalus Kleine, 1944^{i c g}
- Paryphobrenthus Kolbe, 1897^{i c g}
- Peraprophthalmus Kleine, 1923^{i c g}
- Periceocephalus Kleine, 1922^{i c g}
- Phacecerus Schoenherr, 1840^{i c g}
- Phocylides Pascoe, 1872^{i c g}
- Piazocnemis Lacordaire, 1865^{i c g}
- Pithoderes Calabresi, 1920^{i c g}
- Prodector Pascoe, 1862^{i c g}
- Proephebocerus Calabresi, 1920^{i c g}
- Pseudoceocephalus Kleine, 1920^{i c g}
- Pseudomygaleicus De Muizon, 1960^{i c g}
- Pterygostomus Lacordaire, 1865^{i c g}
- Pyresthema Kleine, 1922^{i c g}
- Rhinopteryx Lacordaire, 1865^{i c g}
- Schizotrachelus Lacordaire, 1865^{i c g}
- Schizuropterus Kleine, 1925^{i c g}
- Sennaiella Alonso-Zarazaga, Lyal, Bartolozzi and Sforzi, 1999^{i c g}
- Storeosomus Lacordaire, 1865^{i c g}
- Stroggylosternum Kleine, 1922^{i c g}
- Temnolaimus Chevrolat, 1839^{i c g}
- Thoracobrenthus Damoiseau, 1961^{i c g}
- Uroptera Berthold, 1827^{i c g}
- Uropteroides Kleine, 1922^{i c g}
- Zetophloeus Lacordaire, 1865^{i c g}

Data sources: i = ITIS, c = Catalogue of Life, g = GBIF, b = Bugguide.net
