= Coptorhynchus elegans =

Scientific classification
- Kingdom: Animalia
- Phylum: Arthropoda
- Class: Insecta
- Order: Coleoptera
- Suborder: Polyphaga
- Infraorder: Cucujiformia
- Family: Curculionidae
- Genus: Coptorhynchus
- Species: C. elegans

Binomial name
- Coptorhynchus elegans Heller, K.M., 1900

Species of beetle

Coptorhynchus elegans is a species of weevils in the tribe Celeuthetini. It is found in Indonesia (Borneo, Maluku).
