= Acratini =

Scientific classification
- Kingdom: Animalia
- Phylum: Arthropoda
- Class: Insecta
- Order: Coleoptera
- Suborder: Polyphaga
- Infraorder: Cucujiformia
- Family: Brentidae
- Subfamily: Trachelizinae
- Tribe: Acratini; Alonso-Zarazaga, Lyal, Bartolozzi and Sforzi, 1999

Tribe of beetles

Acratini is a tribe of primitive weevils in the family of beetles known as Brentidae. There are about 12 genera and at least 110 described species in Acratini.

== Genera ==
These 12 genera belong to the tribe Acratini:

- Acratus Lacordaire, 1865^{i c g}
- Fonteboanius Senna, 1893^{i c g}
- Leptocymatium Kleine, 1922^{i c g}
- Neacratus Alonso-Zarazaga, Lyal, Bartolozzi and Sforzi, 1999^{i c g}
- Nemobrenthus Sharp, 1895^{i c g}
- Nemocephalinus Kleine, 1927^{i c g}
- Nemocephalus Guérin-Méneville, 1827^{i c g}
- Nemocoryna Sharp, 1895^{i c g}
- Proteramocerus Kleine, 1921^{i c g}
- Sclerotrachelus Kleine, 1921^{i c g}
- Teramocerus Schoenherr, 1840^{i c g}
- Thaumastopsis Kleine, 1921^{i c g}

Data sources: i = ITIS, c = Catalogue of Life, g = GBIF, b = Bugguide.net
