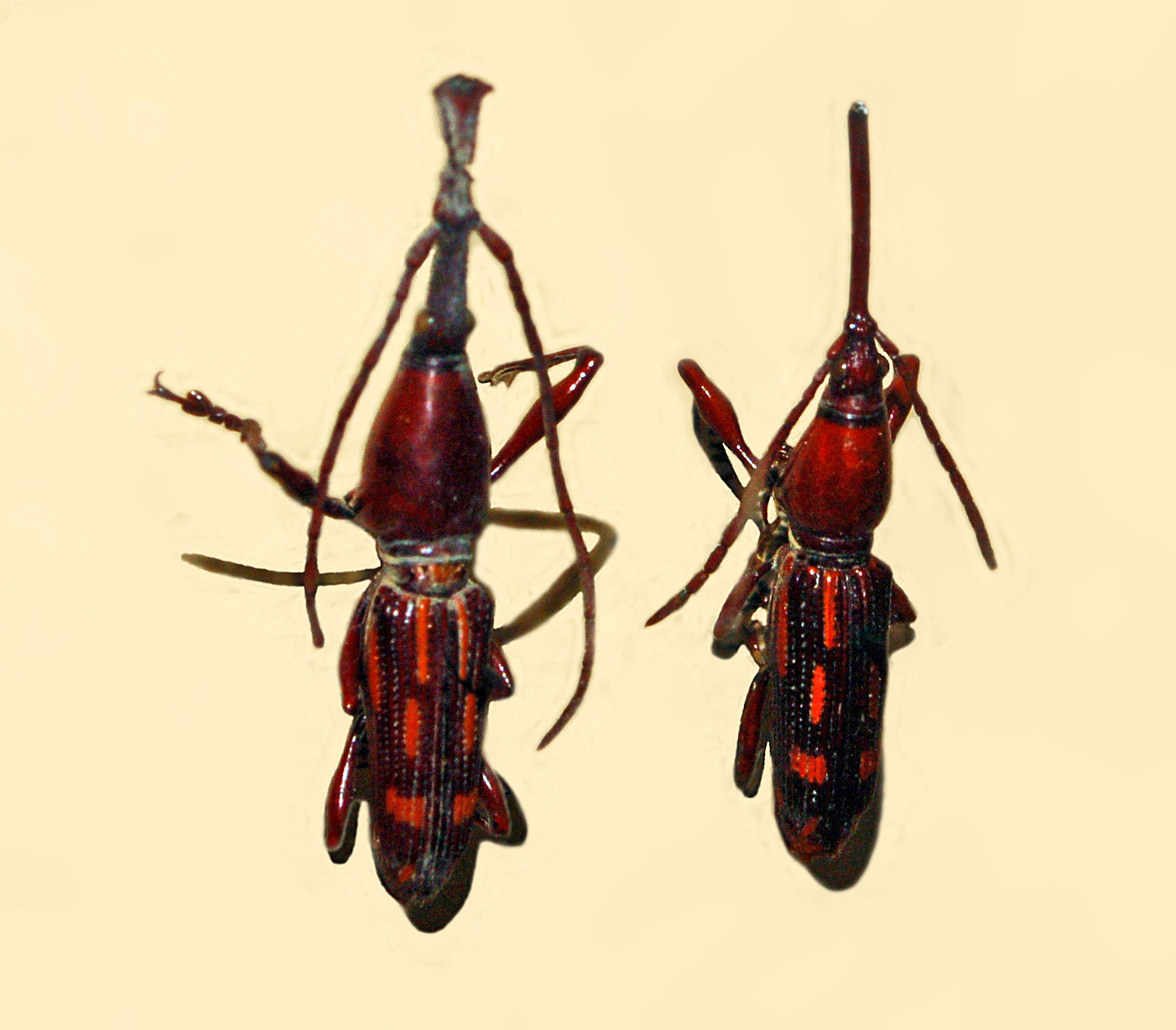
- Male and female of Ithystenus wallacei from Western Papua. Mounted specimen.

Scientific classification
- Kingdom: Animalia
- Phylum: Arthropoda
- Class: Insecta
- Order: Coleoptera
- Suborder: Polyphaga
- Infraorder: Cucujiformia
- Family: Brentidae
- Subfamily: Brentinae
- Tribe: Trachelizini
- Genus: Ithystenus
- Species: I. wallacei

Binomial name
- Ithystenus wallacei Pascoe, 1862

= Ithystenus wallacei =

Species of beetle

Ithystenus wallacei is a species of straight-snouted weevils belonging to the family Brentidae.

== Distribution ==
This species can be found in Western Papua; Aru Islands, Mysol Island.
