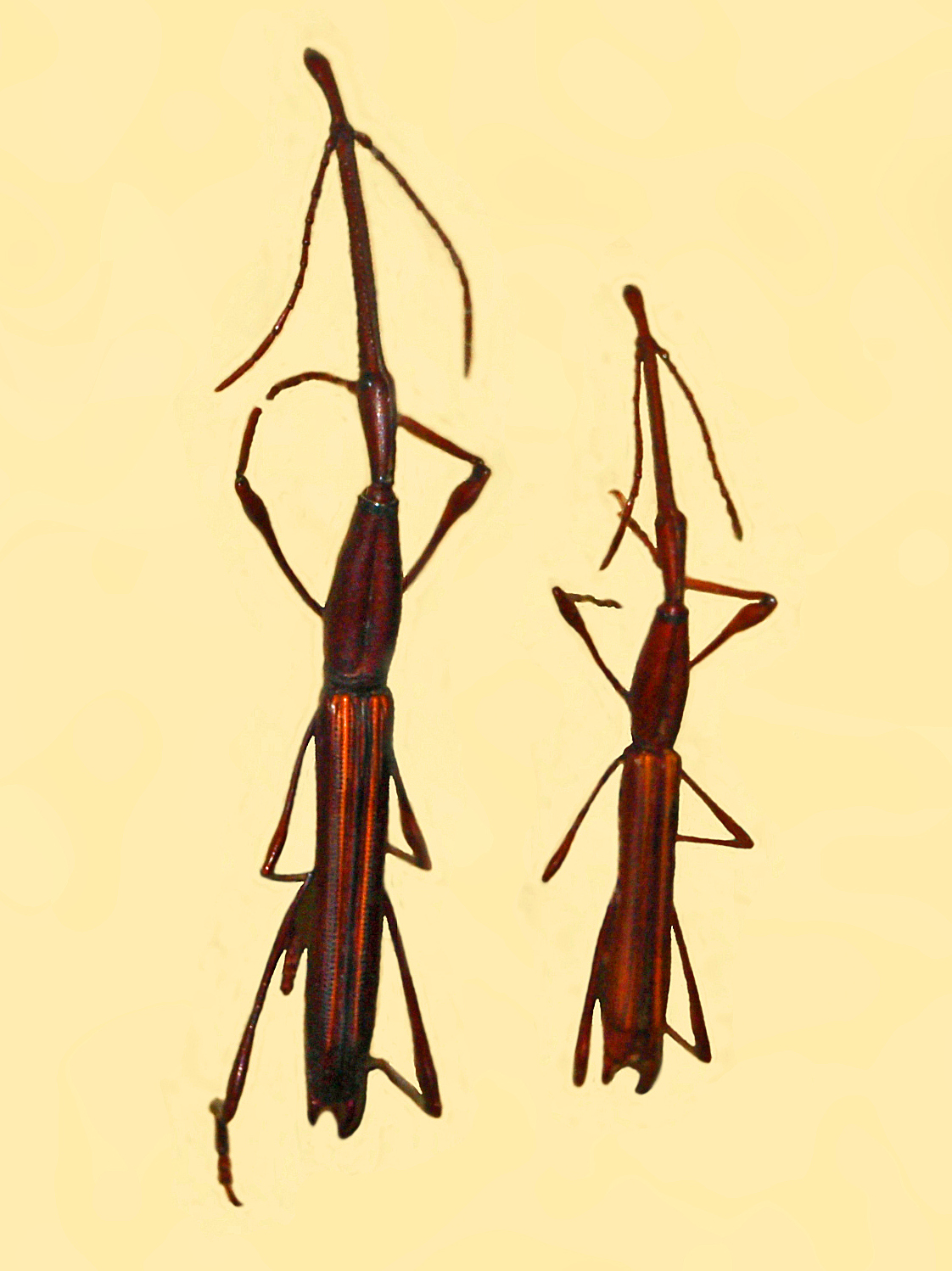
- Ithystenus curvidens from Papua New Guinea

Scientific classification
- Kingdom: Animalia
- Phylum: Arthropoda
- Clade: Pancrustacea
- Class: Insecta
- Order: Coleoptera
- Suborder: Polyphaga
- Infraorder: Cucujiformia
- Family: Brentidae
- Subfamily: Brentinae
- Tribe: Trachelizini
- Genus: Ithystenus
- Species: I. curvidens

Binomial name
- Ithystenus curvidens (Montrouzier, 1855)

= Ithystenus curvidens =

Species of beetle

Ithystenus curvidens is a species of straight-snouted weevils belonging to the family Brentidae.

== Distribution ==
This species can be found in Papua New Guinea, Bismarck Archipelago: New Britain; Woodlark Island; West Papua; Aru Islands.
