= Paratrachelizus uncimanus =

Scientific classification
- Kingdom: Animalia
- Phylum: Arthropoda
- Class: Insecta
- Order: Coleoptera
- Suborder: Polyphaga
- Infraorder: Cucujiformia
- Family: Brentidae
- Genus: Paratrachelizus
- Species: P. uncimanus

Binomial name
- Paratrachelizus uncimanus (Boheman, 1839)

Species of beetle

Paratrachelizus uncimanus is a species of primitive weevil in the beetle family Brentidae. It is found in the Caribbean Sea and North America.
