= Monteithus subviridis =

Scientific classification
- Kingdom: Animalia
- Phylum: Arthropoda
- Clade: Pancrustacea
- Class: Insecta
- Order: Coleoptera
- Suborder: Polyphaga
- Infraorder: Cucujiformia
- Superfamily: Curculionoidea
- Family: Curculionidae
- Genus: Monteithus
- Species: M. subviridis

Binomial name
- Monteithus subviridis (Lea, 1930)

Synonyms
- Eutinophaea subviridis Lea, 1930

Species of beetle

Monteithus subviridis is a species of beetle of the family Curculionidae. It is found in Australia (Queensland).

== Description ==
Adults reach a length of about 3 mm (0.12 in). They are dark reddish-brown, with the legs and antennae paler. They are densely clothed with scales varying from whitish to dark brown, and becoming green on the sides. The setae on the elytra are only found on the alternate interstices.
