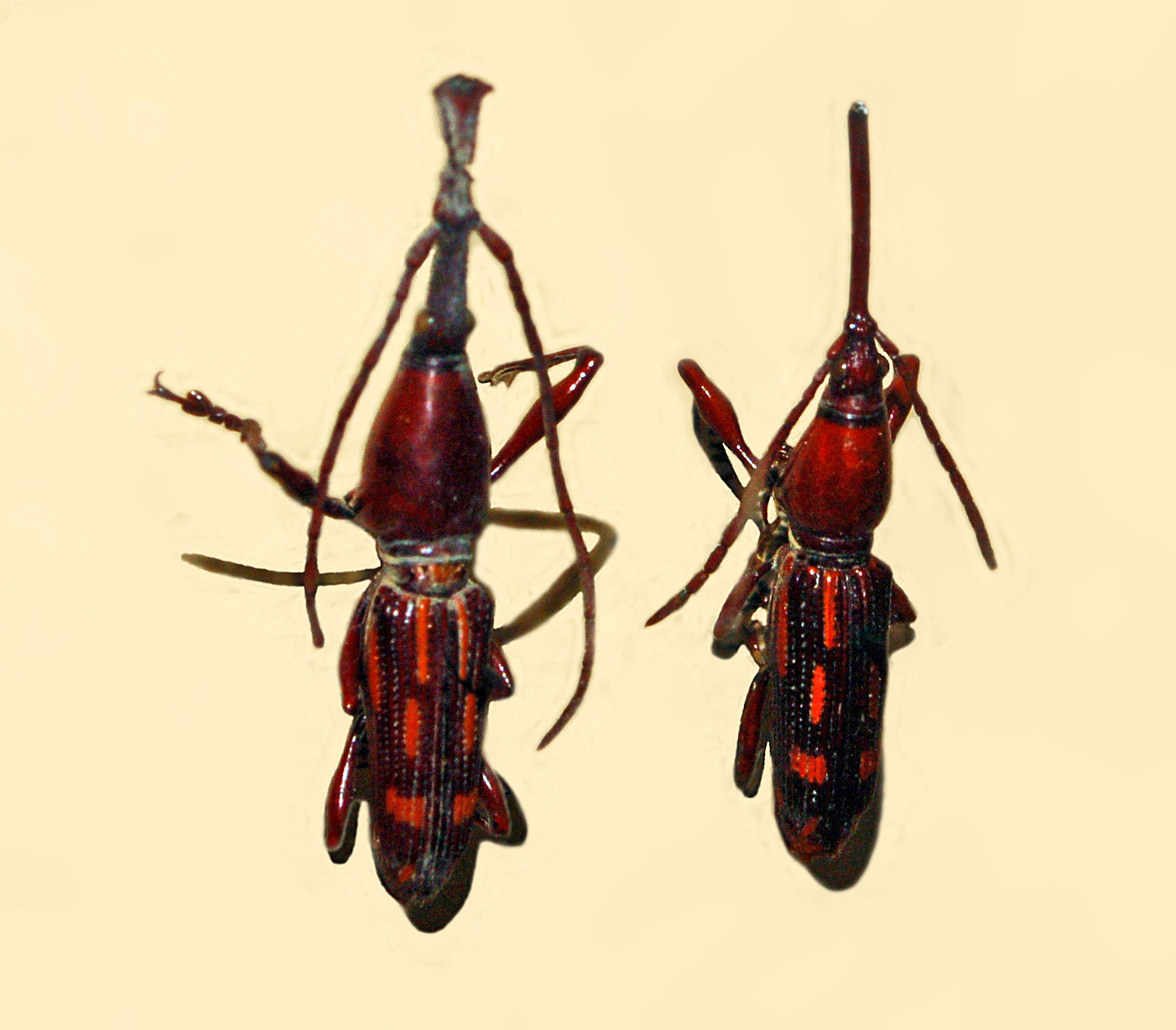
- Male and female of Ithystenus wallacei from West Papua. Mounted specimen.

Scientific classification
- Domain: Eukaryota
- Kingdom: Animalia
- Phylum: Arthropoda
- Class: Insecta
- Order: Coleoptera
- Suborder: Polyphaga
- Infraorder: Cucujiformia
- Family: Brentidae
- Subfamily: Trachelizinae
- Tribe: Trachelizini
- Genus: Ithystenus; Pascoe, 1862

Synonyms
- Leptorhynchus Boisduval, 1835 (Preocc.); Leptorynchus Boisduval, 1835 (Missp.); Coptorhynchus Desbrochers, 1892; Ithistenus Senna, 1892 (Missp.)

= Ithystenus =

Genus of beetles

Ithystenus is a genus of straight-snouted weevils belonging to the family Brentidae. Species of this genus can be found in Papua New Guinea and Australia.

== List of species ==
These 46 species belong to the genus Ithystenus:

- Ithystenus adoptivus Kleine, 1919
- Ithystenus alatus Kleine, 1919
- Ithystenus angustatus Guérin-Méneville, 1831
- Ithystenus appendiculatus Kleine, 1919
- Ithystenus barbirostris Kleine, 1920
- Ithystenus bicolor Sforzi & Bartolozzi, 2004
- Ithystenus bistriatus Kleine, 1919
- Ithystenus caudatus Kleine, 1919
- Ithystenus cavicaudatus Goossens, 2005
- Ithystenus chevrolatii (Boisduval, 1835)
- Ithystenus confluens Kleine, 1919
- Ithystenus cultellatus Kleine, 1919
- Ithystenus cupreus Kleine, 1943
- Ithystenus curvidens (Montrouzier, 1855)
- Ithystenus cyaneiventris Kleine, 1926
- Ithystenus debilis Sharp, 1900
- Ithystenus decorus Kleine, 1919
- Ithystenus densepunctatus Kleine, 1919
- Ithystenus diversicolor Kleine, 1930
- Ithystenus forficulatus Kleine, 1931
- Ithystenus francoisi (Desbrochers des Loges, 1892)
- Ithystenus franklini Kleine, 1925
- Ithystenus franklinmuelleri Kleine, 1925
- Ithystenus frontalis Pascoe, 1862
- Ithystenus fumosus Pascoe, 1862
- Ithystenus furvus Kleine, 1925
- Ithystenus hebridarum Senna, 1897
- Ithystenus hollandiae (Boisduval, 1835)
- Ithystenus impar Kleine, 1943
- Ithystenus leveri Kleine, 1939
- Ithystenus limbourgi Goossens, 2008
- Ithystenus linearis Pascoe, 1862
- Ithystenus mocsaryi (Bolkay, 1910)
- Ithystenus muelleri Kleine, 1925
- Ithystenus nigrosulcatus Fairmaire, 1881
- Ithystenus noonadani Damoiseau, 1966
- Ithystenus ophiopsis Pascoe, 1862
- Ithystenus perlongus Kleine, 1919
- Ithystenus pumilus (Boisduval, 1835)
- Ithystenus punctifrons Kleine, 1919
- Ithystenus rugosipunctatus Kleine, 1935
- Ithystenus sabulosus Kleine, 1919
- Ithystenus similis Kleine, 1919
- Ithystenus spinosus Kleine, 1919
- Ithystenus unicolor Kleine, 1919
- Ithystenus wallacei Pascoe, 1862
