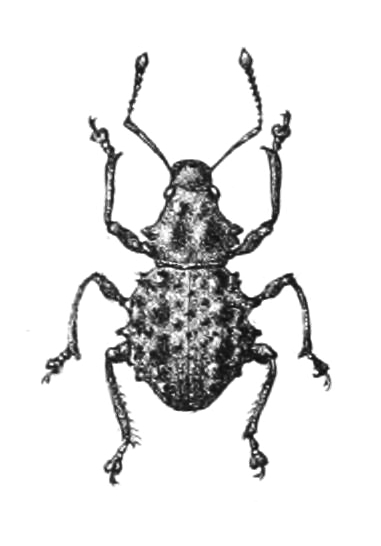
- Phraotes tuberculatus

Scientific classification
- Kingdom: Animalia
- Phylum: Arthropoda
- Clade: Pancrustacea
- Class: Insecta
- Order: Coleoptera
- Suborder: Polyphaga
- Infraorder: Cucujiformia
- Family: Curculionidae
- Subfamily: Entiminae
- Tribe: Celeuthetini; Lacordaire, 1863

Genera
- See text

= Celeuthetini =

Tribe of beetles

The Celeuthetini are a weevil tribe in the subfamily Entiminae.

== Genera ==
Acoptorrhynchus – Albertisius – Apiezonotus – Apirocalodes – Apirocalus – Apotomorhamphus – Arrhaphogaster – Atactoglymma – Atactophysis – Aulacophrys – Behrensiellus – Bonthaina – Borneobius – Borodinophilus – Brachynedus – Calidiopsis – Celeuthetes – Choerorhamphus – Cnemidothrix – Colpomus – Coptorhynchus – Cyrtetes – Ectemnomerus – Elytrocheilas – Enaptomias – Eupyrgops – Grammicodes – Hellerrhinus – Heteroglymma – Hypotactus – Idiopsodes – Javaulius – Kietana – Kokodanas – Levoecus – Lophothetes – Machaerostylus – Mesocoptus – Microthetes – Moluccobius – Monteithus – Mutilliarius – Nanyozo – Neopyrgops – Nothes – Oeidirrhynchus – Ogasawarazo – Opterus – Oribius – Pachyrhynchidius – Parasphenogaster – Paratactus – Peteinus – Philicoptus – Phraotes – Picronotus – Piezonotus – Platyacus – Platysimus – Platyspartus – Pseudottistira – Pteros – Pyrgops – Resites – Samobius – Sphaeropterus – Sphaerorhinus – Sphenogaster – Strotus – Syntorophus – Tarunus – Temnogastrus – Tetragynetes – Thompsoniella – Trigonops – Trigonospartus – Zeugorrhinus
