= Acratus (beetle) =

Scientific classification
- Kingdom: Animalia
- Phylum: Arthropoda
- Clade: Pancrustacea
- Class: Insecta
- Order: Coleoptera
- Suborder: Polyphaga
- Infraorder: Cucujiformia
- Superfamily: Curculionoidea
- Family: Brentidae
- Tribe: Acratini
- Genus: Acratus; Lacordaire, 1865

Genus of beetles

Acratus is a genus of primitive weevils in the family of beetles known as Brentidae. There are at least 30 described species in Acratus.

== Species ==
These 34 species belong to the genus Acratus:

- Acratus apicalis Sharp, 1895^{i c g}
- Acratus armatus Senna, 1897^{i c g}
- Acratus bechynei Soares, 1970^{i c g}
- Acratus bellus Soares, 1970^{i c g}
- Acratus carioca Soares, 1970^{i c g}
- Acratus diringshofeni Soares, 1970^{i c g}
- Acratus disjunctus Kleine, 1927^{i c g}
- Acratus durabilis Kleine, 1927^{i c g}
- Acratus errabundus Kleine, 1927^{i c g}
- Acratus expectatus Kleine, 1927^{i c g}
- Acratus expressus Kleine, 1927^{i c g}
- Acratus exquisitus Kleine, 1927^{i c g}
- Acratus extraordinarius Kleine, 1927^{i c g}
- Acratus extrarius Kleine, 1927^{i c g}
- Acratus fallax Kleine, 1927^{i c g}
- Acratus fidelis Kleine, 1927^{i c g}
- Acratus gracilipes Soares, 1970^{i c g}
- Acratus interruptolineatus (Gyllenhal, 1833)^{i c g}
- Acratus laevigatus (Boheman, 1840)^{i c g}
- Acratus mendax Soares, 1970^{i c g}
- Acratus nitidissimus Soares, 1970^{i c g}
- Acratus plumirostris (Boheman, 1840)^{i c g}
- Acratus pohli Soares, 1970^{i c g}
- Acratus propinquus Senna, 1890^{i c g}
- Acratus pseudoarticulatus Soares, 1970^{i c g}
- Acratus ruber (Erichson, 1847)^{i c g}
- Acratus seabrai Soares and Meyer, 1959^{i c g}
- Acratus seorsus Soares, 1970^{i c g}
- Acratus subfasciatus (Boheman, 1840)^{i c g}
- Acratus suratus (Boheman, 1840)^{i c g}
- Acratus suturalis (Lund, 1800)^{i c g}
- Acratus tarsatus (Gyllenhal, 1833)^{i c g}
- Acratus telesi Soares and Meyer, 1959^{i c g}
- Acratus villens Soares, 1970^{i c g}

Data sources: i = ITIS, c = Catalogue of Life, g = GBIF, b = Bugguide.net
