= Phocylides (beetle) =

Scientific classification
- Domain: Eukaryota
- Kingdom: Animalia
- Phylum: Arthropoda
- Class: Insecta
- Order: Coleoptera
- Suborder: Polyphaga
- Infraorder: Cucujiformia
- Family: Brentidae
- Tribe: Pseudoceocephalini
- Genus: Phocylides; Pascoe, 1872

Genus of beetles

Phocylides is a genus of primitive weevils in the family of beetles known as Brentidae. There is at least one described species in Phocylides, P. bicolor.
