= Paratrachelizus =

Scientific classification
- Domain: Eukaryota
- Kingdom: Animalia
- Phylum: Arthropoda
- Class: Insecta
- Order: Coleoptera
- Suborder: Polyphaga
- Infraorder: Cucujiformia
- Family: Brentidae
- Tribe: Trachelizini
- Genus: Paratrachelizus; Kleine, 1921

Genus of beetles

Paratrachelizus is a genus of primitive weevils in the beetle family Brentidae. There are more than 30 described species in Paratrachelizus.

== Species ==
These 35 species belong to the genus Paratrachelizus:

- Paratrachelizus adustus (Boheman, 1840)
- Paratrachelizus advena (Sharp, 1895)
- Paratrachelizus afflictus Kleine, 1922
- Paratrachelizus agnatus Kleine, 1922
- Paratrachelizus arduus (Sharp, 1895)
- Paratrachelizus aureopilosus (Senna, 1890)
- Paratrachelizus clavicornis (Boheman, 1840)
- Paratrachelizus cognatus (Sharp, 1895)
- Paratrachelizus dispar (Sharp, 1895)
- Paratrachelizus dorsalis (Boheman, 1840)
- Paratrachelizus ducalis (Sharp, 1895)
- Paratrachelizus elevatus (Sharp, 1895)
- Paratrachelizus ferrugineus (Lund, 1800)
- Paratrachelizus filiformis (Sharp, 1895)
- Paratrachelizus fracticornis (Sharp, 1895)
- Paratrachelizus frontalis (Sharp, 1895)
- Paratrachelizus geminatus (Sharp, 1895)
- Paratrachelizus laticollis (Sharp, 1895)
- Paratrachelizus linearis (Suffrian, 1870)
- Paratrachelizus lineatus (Sharp, 1895)
- Paratrachelizus nigricornis (Sharp, 1895)
- Paratrachelizus occlusus (Sharp, 1895)
- Paratrachelizus optatus (Sharp, 1895)
- Paratrachelizus prolixus (Sharp, 1895)
- Paratrachelizus punctatus Soares & Meyer, 1959
- Paratrachelizus robustus (Sharp, 1895)
- Paratrachelizus seriatus (Sharp, 1895)
- Paratrachelizus serratus (Sharp, 1895)
- Paratrachelizus simplex (Suffrian, 1870)
- Paratrachelizus sternalis (Sharp, 1895)
- Paratrachelizus sulcirostris (Boheman, 1833)
- Paratrachelizus tenuis (Suffrian, 1870)
- Paratrachelizus turgidirostris (Boheman, 1840)
- Paratrachelizus uncimanus (Boheman, 1839)
- Paratrachelizus ventralis Haedo Rossi, 1954
