= Trachelizinae =

Scientific classification
- Domain: Eukaryota
- Kingdom: Animalia
- Phylum: Arthropoda
- Class: Insecta
- Order: Coleoptera
- Suborder: Polyphaga
- Infraorder: Cucujiformia
- Family: Brentidae
- Subfamily: Trachelizinae; Lacordaire, 1865

Subfamily of beetles

Trachelizinae is a subfamily of primitive weevils in the family of beetles known as Brentidae. There are at least 110 genera and 710 described species in Trachelizinae.

== See also ==
- List of Trachelizinae genera
