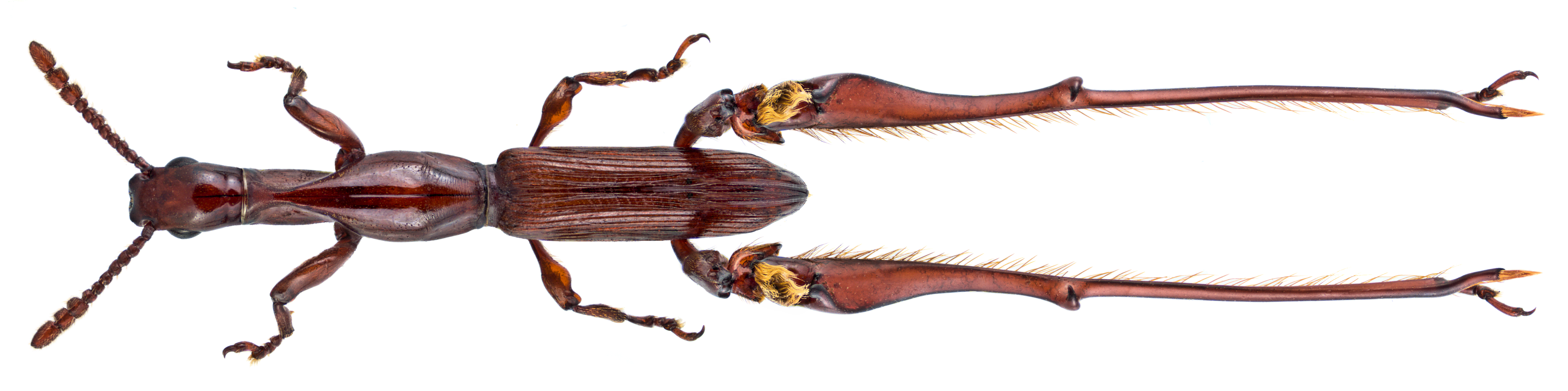
- Calodromus mellyi

Scientific classification
- Kingdom: Animalia
- Phylum: Arthropoda
- Clade: Pancrustacea
- Class: Insecta
- Order: Coleoptera
- Suborder: Polyphaga
- Infraorder: Cucujiformia
- Superfamily: Curculionoidea
- Family: Brentidae
- Subfamily: Brentinae
- Tribe: Cyphagogini; H.J. Kolbe, 1892

Synonyms
- Cyphogoginae Kolbe, 1892; Cyphogogini Kolbe, 1892

= Cyphagogini =

Tribe of beetles

Cyphagogini is a tribe of beetles in the subfamily of weevils known as Brentinae, based on the type genus Cyphagogus. The taxonomy of family Brentidae is debated and this tribe was treated previously as subfamily Cyphagoginae.

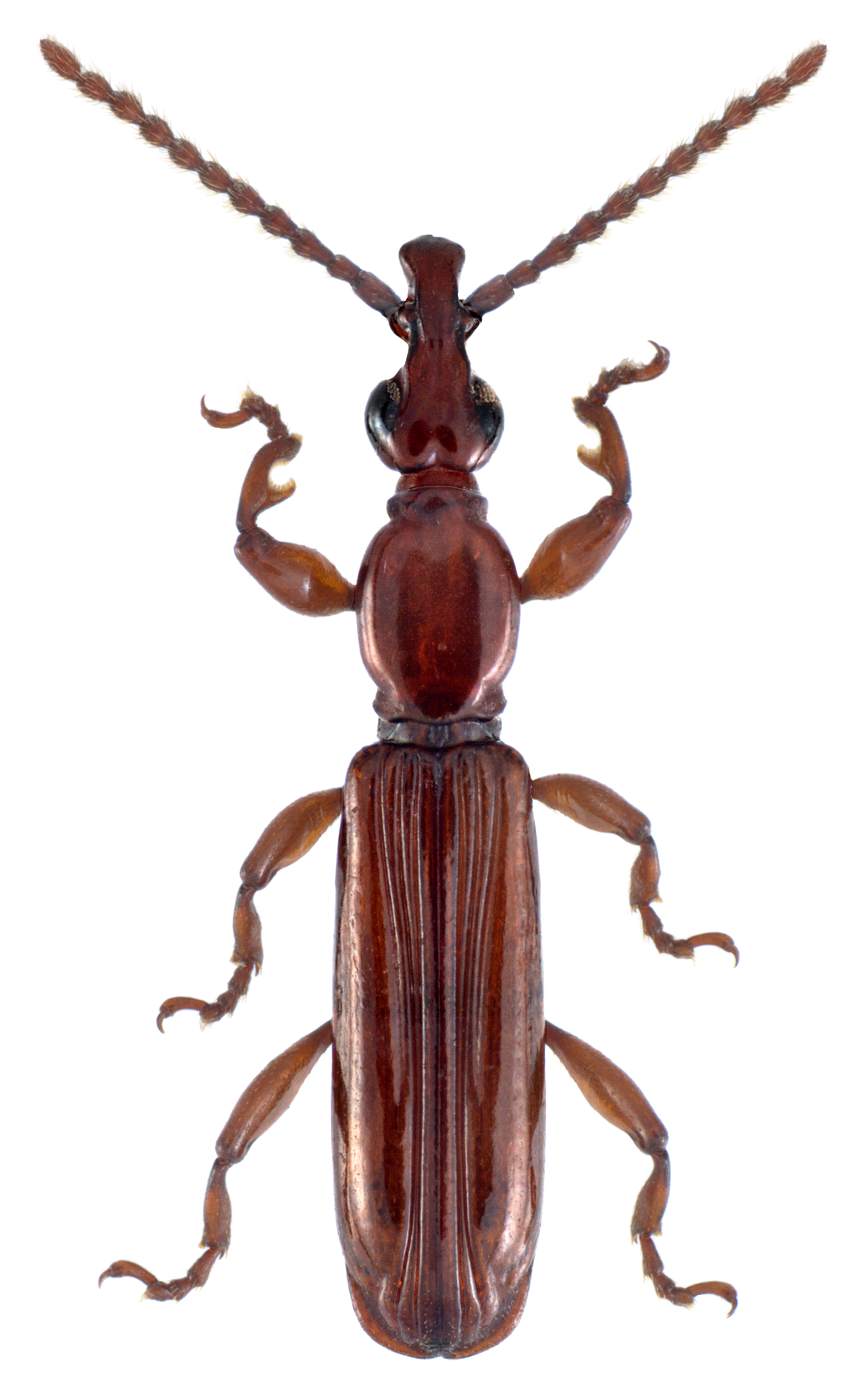
Cerobates sexsulcatus

== Subtribes and genera ==
BioLib includes 3 subribes in the tribe Cyphagogini:

subtribe Cyphagogina H.J. Kolbe, 1892

1. Allaeometrus Senna, 1903
2. Callipareius Senna, 1892
3. Calodromus Guérin-Méneville, 1832
4. Chelorhinus Kleine, 1922
5. Cyphagogus Parry, 1849^{i c g}
6. Eterozemus Senna, 1903
7. Mesoderes Senna, 1898
8. Microsebus H.J. Kolbe, 1892
9. Opisthenoxys Kleine, 1922
10. Thrasycephalus Kleine, 1916

subtribe Hoplopisthiina Senna & Calabresi, 1919

1. Aneorhachis Kleine, 1923
2. Entomopisthius Muizon, 1959
3. Higonius Lewis, 1883
4. Hoplopisthius Senna, 1892^{i c g}
5. Neohigonius Goossens, 2005

subtribe Stereodermina Sharp, 1895

1. Afrodermus Mantilleri, 2005
2. Cerobates Schoenherr, 1840
3. Hyperephanus Senna, 1892
4. Metatrachelizus Kleine, 1922
5. Pseudanchisteus Kleine, 1922
6. Stereobates Sharp, 1895
7. Stereobatinus Kleine, 1927
8. Stereodermus Lacordaire, 1866^{i c g b}
9. Steroderminus Kleine, 1927

=== Unplaced genera ===
1. Adidactus Senna, 1894^{i c g}
2. Allagogus Gahan, 1909
3. Amobaeus Kleine, 1925
4. Amphithetobrentus Damoiseau, 1963
5. Ancylobrentus Kleine, 1922
6. Autometrus Kleine, 1922
7. Autosebus Kolbe, 1916
8. Azemius Damoiseau, 1961
9. Basenius Kolbe, 1892
10. Caenosebus Kleine, 1916
11. Catagogus Kleine, 1926
12. Ceragogus Kleine, 1925
13. Cormopus Kolbe, 1892
14. Dentisebus Muizon, 1960
15. Diastrophocoleps Damoiseau, 1967
16. Dyscheromorphus Kleine, 1916
17. Ecnomobrentus Damoiseau, 1965
18. Eugeniobrentus Damoiseau, 1963
19. Eurorhinus Damoiseau, 1961
20. Genogogus Kleine, 1925
21. Isomorphus Kleine, 1916
22. Macropareia Kleine, 1932
23. Megalosebus Kolbe, 1916
24. Metusambius Kolbe, 1916
25. Nannobrenthus Kolbe, 1916
26. Neocyphagogus Damoiseau, 1979
27. Neosebus Senna, 1902
28. Neoxybasius Kolbe, 1916
29. Neozemioses Damoiseau, 1989
30. Nesidiobrentus Damoiseau, 1964
31. Odontopareius Damoiseau, 1964
32. Oncodemerus Senna, 1892
33. Opisthozemius Kolbe, 1916
34. Palaeoparagogus Damoiseau, 1979
35. Paraclidorhinus Senna, 1902
36. Paradidactus Quentin, 1966
37. Paragogus Kleine, 1926
38. Paramicrosebus Damoiseau, 1962
39. Parasebasius Muizon, 1955
40. Parusambius Kleine, 1925
41. Pittodes Kleine, 1922
42. Podozemius Kolbe, 1916
43. Protoproctus Kolbe, 1916
44. Protusambius Kolbe, 1916
45. Pseudamobaeus Damoiseau, 1967
46. Pseudoadidactus Muizon, 1955
47. Pseudocyphagonus Desbrochers, 1890
48. Pseudoparagogus de Muizon, 1955
49. Pseudousambius Muizon, 1955
50. Schizoadidactus Kleine, 1916
51. Sebasius Lacordaire, 1866
52. Stibacephalus Kleine, 1916
53. Synsebasius Kolbe, 1916
54. Tetanocephalus Kleine, 1916
55. Usambioproctus Kolbe, 1916
56. Usambius Kolbe, 1892
57. Vietobrentus Kabakov, 2001
58. Xenadidactus Damoiseau, 1979
59. Xestothorax Damoiseau, 1989
60. Zemioses Pascoe, 1862

Data sources: i = ITIS, c = Catalogue of Life, g = GBIF, b = Bugguide.net
