= Cerobates elegans =

Scientific classification
- Domain: Eukaryota
- Kingdom: Animalia
- Phylum: Arthropoda
- Class: Insecta
- Order: Coleoptera
- Suborder: Polyphaga
- Infraorder: Cucujiformia
- Family: Brentidae
- Genus: Cerobates
- Species: C. elegans

Binomial name
- Cerobates elegans Damoiseau, 1963

Species of beetle

Cerobates elegans is a species of beetles belonging to the family Brentidae, the straight-snouted weevils. It is found in Africa.
