= Stereodermus =

Scientific classification
- Domain: Eukaryota
- Kingdom: Animalia
- Phylum: Arthropoda
- Class: Insecta
- Order: Coleoptera
- Suborder: Polyphaga
- Infraorder: Cucujiformia
- Family: Brentidae
- Subfamily: Cyphagoginae
- Genus: Stereodermus; Lacordaire, 1865

Synonyms
- Metatrachelizus Kleine, 1922; Stereoderminus Kleine, 1927

Genus of beetles

Stereodermus is a genus of primitive weevils in the beetle family Brentidae. There are more than 40 described species in Stereodermus.

== Species ==
These 47 species belong to the genus Stereodermus:

- Stereodermus angularis Mantilleri, 2005
- Stereodermus artificialis (Kleine, 1923)
- Stereodermus attenuatus Mantilleri & Sforzi, 2006
- Stereodermus barbirostris Sharp, 1895
- Stereodermus barclayi Mantilleri, 2004
- Stereodermus bartolozzii Mantilleri, 2005
- Stereodermus breviceps Sharp, 1895
- Stereodermus calvus Sharp, 1895
- Stereodermus carinatus Sharp, 1895
- Stereodermus chontalensis Sharp, 1895
- Stereodermus congruens (Kleine, 1925)
- Stereodermus denisi Mantilleri & Sforzi, 2006
- Stereodermus dentipennis Sharp, 1895
- Stereodermus dentipes Sharp, 1895
- Stereodermus effrenatus (Kleine, 1927)
- Stereodermus eliseannae Mantilleri, 2004
- Stereodermus elytralis Senna, 1903
- Stereodermus exilis Suffrian, 1870
- Stereodermus explanatus Mantilleri & Sforzi, 2006
- Stereodermus ferox (Kleine, 1944)
- Stereodermus fessus Kleine, 1927
- Stereodermus filum Sharp, 1895
- Stereodermus flavotibialis Kleine, 1922
- Stereodermus fucosus (Kleine, 1925)
- Stereodermus gestroi Senna, 1893
- Stereodermus godmani Sharp, 1895
- Stereodermus imparicostatus Mantilleri & Sforzi, 2006
- Stereodermus jonathani Mantilleri, 2004
- Stereodermus latirostris Sharp, 1895
- Stereodermus leucomystax Mantilleri, 2012
- Stereodermus longiceps Sharp, 1895
- Stereodermus maelae Mantilleri, 2004
- Stereodermus micropterus Mantilleri
- Stereodermus mitratus Sharp, 1895
- Stereodermus nathaliae Mantilleri, 2004
- Stereodermus nigriceps Sharp, 1895
- Stereodermus olivieri Mantilleri, 2004
- Stereodermus papuanus Goossens, 2008
- Stereodermus paulettae Mantilleri & Sforzi, 2006
- Stereodermus platycornis Mantilleri
- Stereodermus pseudocongruens Mantilleri, 2005
- Stereodermus puncticollis Sharp, 1895
- Stereodermus pygmaeus (Gyllenhal, 1833)
- Stereodermus raapi Senna, 1897
- Stereodermus similis Mantilleri & Sforzi, 2006
- Stereodermus siporanus Senna, 1898
- Stereodermus zunilensis Sharp, 1895
