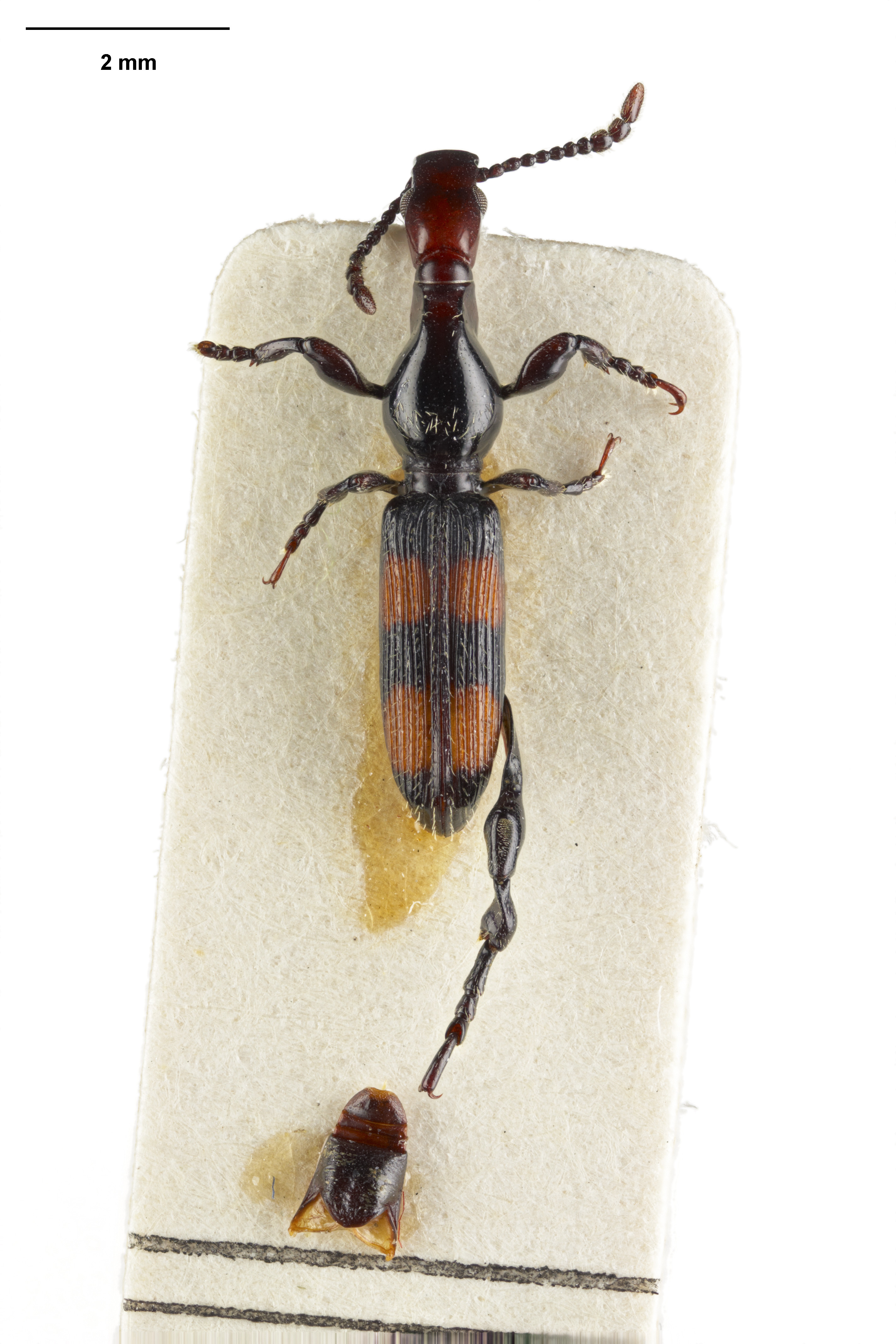
- Cyphagogus bimaculatus

Scientific classification
- Domain: Eukaryota
- Kingdom: Animalia
- Phylum: Arthropoda
- Class: Insecta
- Order: Coleoptera
- Suborder: Polyphaga
- Infraorder: Cucujiformia
- Family: Brentidae
- Subfamily: Brentinae
- Tribe: Cyphagogini
- Genus: Cyphagogus; Parry, 1849

Synonyms
- Arthepigogus Damoiseau, 1964; Chypagogus Kleine, 1914; Cyphagonus Desbrochers, 1890; Nardodes Motschulsky, 1866

= Cyphagogus =

Genus of beetles

Cyphagogus is a genus of straight-snouted weevils in the family Brentidae and typical of the tribe Cyphagogini; it was erected by Frederic Parry in 1849. Records of occurrence are mostly from Indochina, Malesia through to Australia, with a few from Africa.

== Species ==
The Global Biodiversity Information Facility lists

1. Cyphagogus angusticeps Senna, 1893
2. Cyphagogus angustirostris Damoiseau, 1964
3. Cyphagogus aulacothorax Damoiseau, 1989
4. Cyphagogus bakeri Damoiseau, 1989
5. Cyphagogus beesoni Damoiseau, 1964
6. Cyphagogus bimaculatus Damoiseau, 1989
7. Cyphagogus bipunctatus Senna, 1897
8. Cyphagogus bishopi Damoiseau, 1989
9. Cyphagogus boninensis Morimoto & Kojima, 2005
10. Cyphagogus brownei Kleine, 1936
11. Cyphagogus cheesmanae Damoiseau, 1989
12. Cyphagogus conciliatus Kleine, 1926
13. Cyphagogus confertulus Kleine, 1925
14. Cyphagogus confidens Kleine, 1925
15. Cyphagogus corporaali Kleine, 1918
16. Cyphagogus crassicollis Damoiseau, 1989
17. Cyphagogus crassitarsus Damoiseau, 1964
18. Cyphagogus curvitibia Damoiseau, 1989
19. Cyphagogus cyrtotrachelus (Thomson, 1857)
20. Cyphagogus delicatus Lea, 1899
21. Cyphagogus densepunctatus Kleine, 1916
22. Cyphagogus dieckmanni Damoiseau, 1967
23. Cyphagogus eggersi Kleine, 1921
24. Cyphagogus eichhorni Kirsch, 1875
25. Cyphagogus elongatus Kleine, 1916
26. Cyphagogus fijianus Kleine, 1928
27. Cyphagogus gemellus Kleine, 1931
28. Cyphagogus gracilirostris Damoiseau, 1964
29. Cyphagogus greensladi Damoiseau, 1989
30. Cyphagogus hirsutus Goossens, 2008
31. Cyphagogus hornabrooki Damoiseau, 1989
32. Cyphagogus incisus Senna, 1903
33. Cyphagogus indicus Damoiseau, 1964
34. Cyphagogus iwatensis Morimoto, 1976
35. Cyphagogus javanus Kleine, 1916
36. Cyphagogus longulus Senna, 1898
37. Cyphagogus madagascariensis Damoiseau, 1964
38. Cyphagogus malabaricus Damoiseau, 1964
39. Cyphagogus malaysianus Damoiseau, 1989
40. Cyphagogus modiglianii Senna, 1893
41. Cyphagogus moluccanus Damoiseau, 1989
42. Cyphagogus nigraustralis Damoiseau, 1966
43. Cyphagogus nodosus Damoiseau, 1964
44. Cyphagogus odewahnii Pascoe, 1864
45. Cyphagogus palawani Damoiseau, 1964
46. Cyphagogus papuanus Damoiseau, 1989
47. Cyphagogus pasteuri Damoiseau, 1989
48. Cyphagogus pilosus Damoiseau, 1989
49. Cyphagogus planifrons Kirsch, 1875
50. Cyphagogus rubidus Damoiseau, 1967
51. Cyphagogus rufirostris Kleine, 1914
52. Cyphagogus rugaticollis Damoiseau, 1989
53. Cyphagogus samoanus Kleine, 1928
54. Cyphagogus sarasini Senna, 1899
55. Cyphagogus scissicollis Damoiseau, 1989
56. Cyphagogus scutellatus Damoiseau, 1964
57. Cyphagogus signipes Lewis, 1883
58. Cyphagogus silvanus Senna, 1903
59. Cyphagogus splendens Kleine, 1916
60. Cyphagogus tabacicola Senna, 1893
61. Cyphagogus thoracicus Kleine, 1933
62. Cyphagogus tristriatus Kleine, 1916
63. Cyphagogus undulatus Damoiseau, 1964
64. Cyphagogus westwoodii Parry, 1849 - type species
65. Cyphagogus whitii (Westwood, 1848)
66. Cyphagogus wittmeri Damoiseau, 1989
