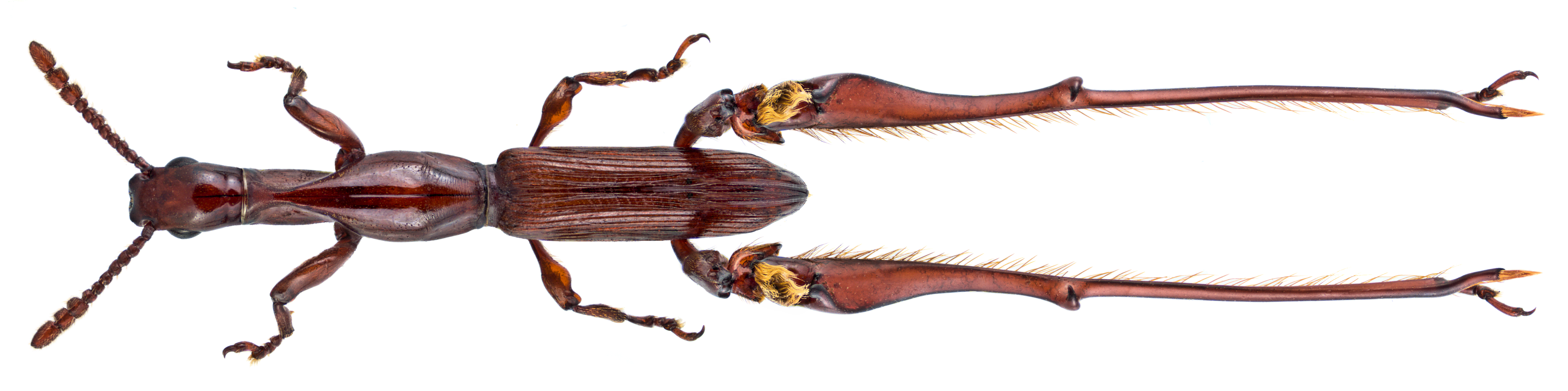
- Male specimen of Calodromus mellyi from Vietnam. Size: 9mm
- Species of Calodromus from the University of Amsterdam

Scientific classification
- Kingdom: Animalia
- Phylum: Arthropoda
- Clade: Pancrustacea
- Class: Insecta
- Order: Coleoptera
- Suborder: Polyphaga
- Infraorder: Cucujiformia
- Superfamily: Curculionoidea
- Family: Brentidae
- Subfamily: Brentinae
- Tribe: Cyphagogini
- Genus: Calodromus; Guérin-Méneville, 1832

Species
- 17 (see text)

= Calodromus =

Genus of beetles

Calodromus is a genus of curculionoid beetles that belongs to the family Brentidae. The main characteristics of this genus are their striking posterior legs which are elongated and thickened.

== Taxonomy ==
=== Species ===
This genus currently contains around 14 described species. They are listed below:

- Calodromus amabilis Kleine, 1916
- Calodromus bambii Orbach & Bartolozzi. 2017
- Calodromus crinitus Kleine, 1922
- Calodromus douglasi Kleine, 1931
- Calodromus goosseni Cheong & Bartolozzi. 2018
- Calodromus horishanus Kano, 1930
- Calodromus insignis (Senna, 1895)
- Calodromus integer Damoiseau, 1971
- Calodromus ito Damoiseau, 1971
- Calodromus kalabakani Bartolozzi, 2011
- Calodromus kosteliae Damoiseau, 1964
- Calodromus luzonicus Bartolozzi, 2011
- Calodromus malgosiae Bartolozzi, 2011
- Calodromus mantillerii Cheong & Bartolozzi. 2018
- Calodromus mellyi Guérin-Méneville & Gory, 1832
- Calodromus simplex Heller, 1910
- Calodromus vethi Kleine, 1915
