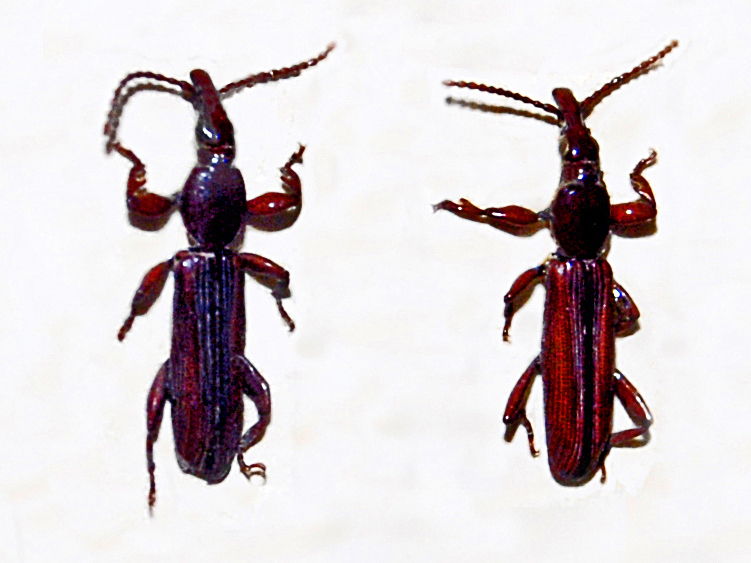
- Cerobates tristriatus from Enggano Island

Scientific classification
- Kingdom: Animalia
- Phylum: Arthropoda
- Clade: Pancrustacea
- Class: Insecta
- Order: Coleoptera
- Suborder: Polyphaga
- Infraorder: Cucujiformia
- Superfamily: Curculionoidea
- Family: Brentidae
- Genus: Cerobates
- Species: C. tristriatus

Binomial name
- Cerobates tristriatus Lund, 1800

= Cerobates tristriatus =

Species of beetle

Cerobates tristriatus is a species of beetles belonging to the family Brentidae.

== Description ==
Cerobates tristriatus can reach a length of about 7 millimetres (0.28 in). Females lay eggs on the surface of decayed bark of sapwood, where the larvae construct radial galleries.

== Distribution ==
This species is widely distributed from Sri Lanka to Australia.
