= Stereodermus exilis =

Scientific classification
- Domain: Eukaryota
- Kingdom: Animalia
- Phylum: Arthropoda
- Class: Insecta
- Order: Coleoptera
- Suborder: Polyphaga
- Infraorder: Cucujiformia
- Family: Brentidae
- Genus: Stereodermus
- Species: S. exilis

Binomial name
- Stereodermus exilis Suffrian, 1870

Species of beetle

Stereodermus exilis is a species of primitive weevil in the beetle family Brentidae. It is found in the Caribbean Sea and North America.
