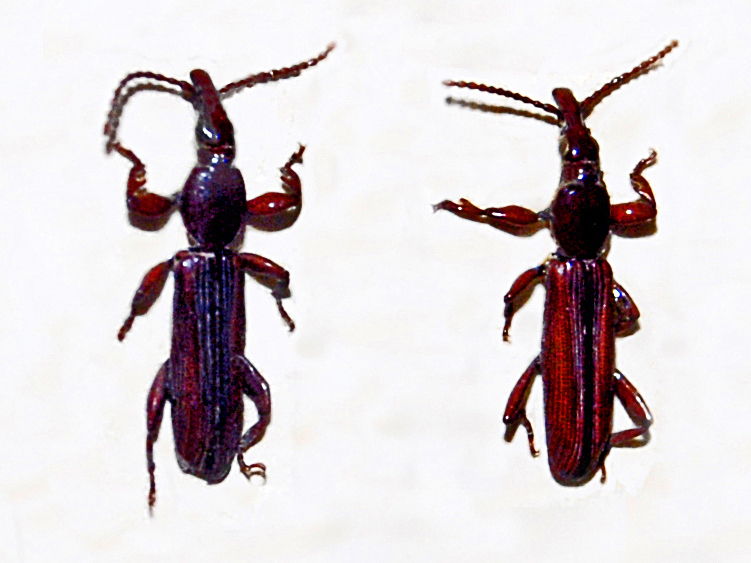
- Cerobates tristriatus

Scientific classification
- Domain: Eukaryota
- Kingdom: Animalia
- Phylum: Arthropoda
- Class: Insecta
- Order: Coleoptera
- Suborder: Polyphaga
- Infraorder: Cucujiformia
- Family: Brentidae
- Genus: Cerobates; Schoenherr, 1840

= Cerobates =

Genus of beetles

Cerobates is a genus of beetles belonging to the family Brentidae.

== Species ==
- Cerobates elegans
- Cerobates enganoënsis
- Cerobates fleutiauxi
- Cerobates pidigala
- Cerobates pygmaeus
- Cerobates sennae
- Cerobates sulcatus
- Cerobates tristriatus
