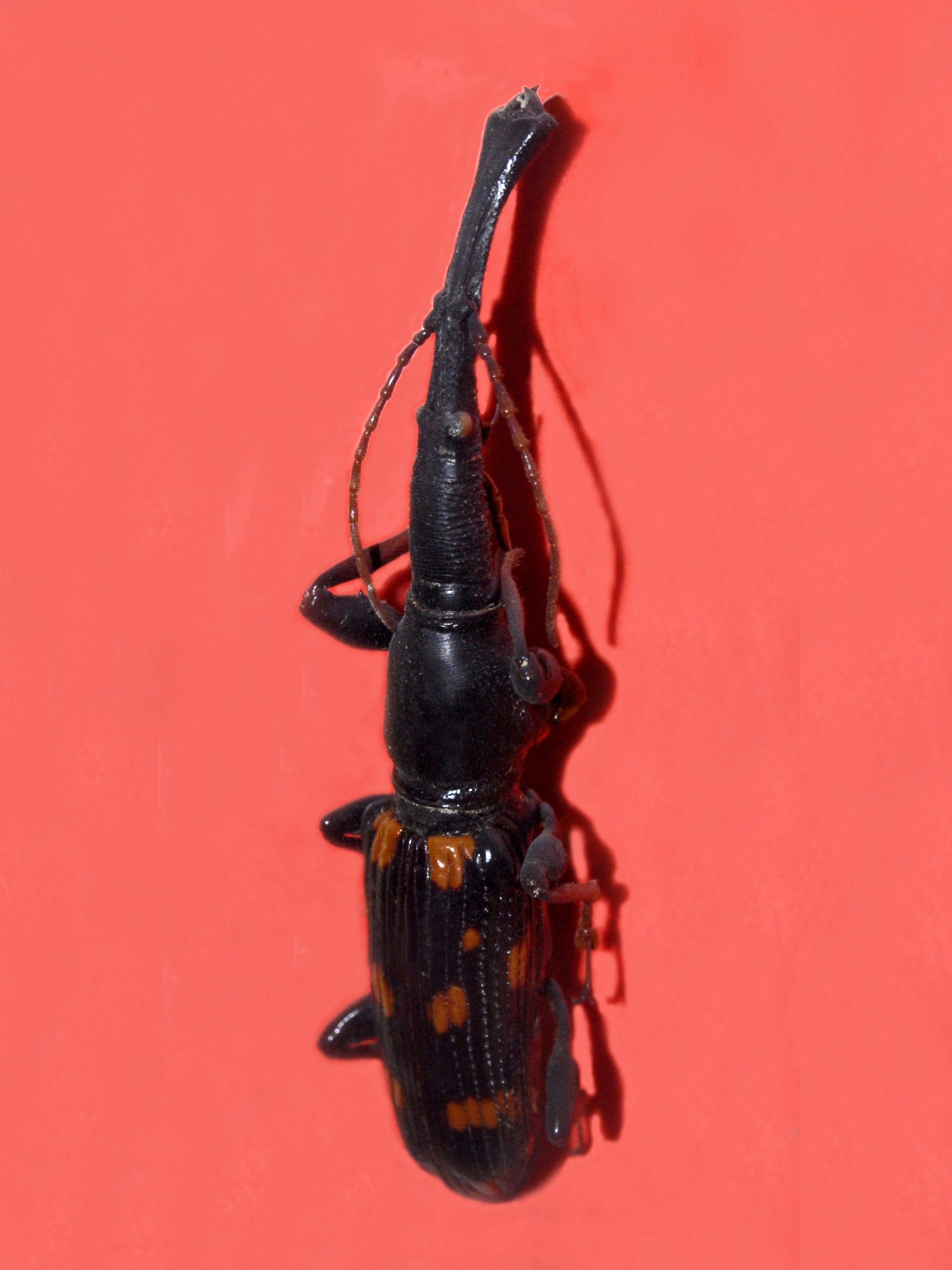
- Museum specimen of Eutrachelus temmincki

Scientific classification
- Kingdom: Animalia
- Phylum: Arthropoda
- Clade: Pancrustacea
- Class: Insecta
- Order: Coleoptera
- Suborder: Polyphaga
- Infraorder: Cucujiformia
- Family: Brentidae
- Genus: Eutrachelus
- Species: E. temmincki

Binomial name
- Eutrachelus temmincki (Latreille, 1825)

= Eutrachelus temmincki =

Species of beetle

Eutrachelus temmincki is a species of straight-snouted weevils belonging to the family Brentidae.

== Etymology ==
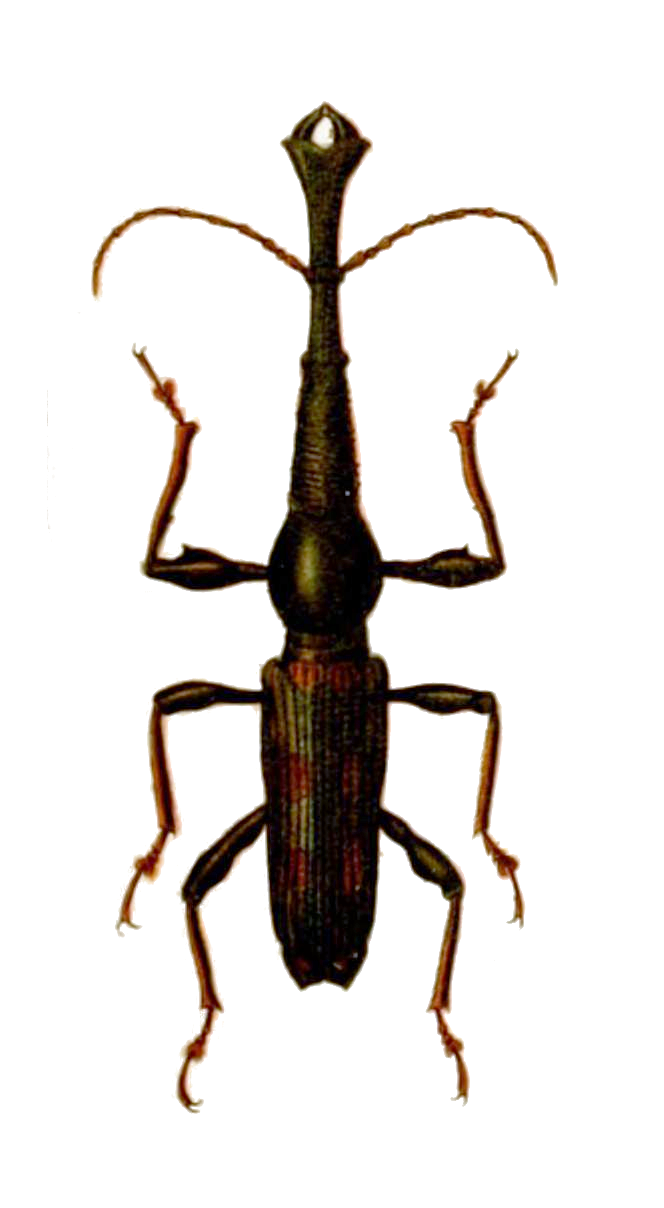

Species name honors Coenraad Jacob Temminck (31 March 1778 – 30 January 1858), a Dutch zoologist.

== Description ==
Eutrachelus temmincki is the largest species in the family Brentidae and has one of the longest snouts among beetles. These giant weevils can reach a length of 55–75 millimetres (2.2–3.0 in) in males (including snout), while females are smaller (about 65 mm.), with a narrower head and snout. Body is elongated, with a long snout and more or less developed jaws. The basic color is black with small orange to red spots on the elytra.

== Distribution ==
This species is present in Indonesia and Malaysia (Borneo, Sumatra, Java, Thailand).

== Bibliography ==
- Wtaxa
- Zin.ru
- Biolib
- Sforzi A, Bartolozzi L. Brentidae of the World (Coleoptera, Curculionoidea). Museo Regionale di Scienze Naturali, 2004 s. 214-215
